= James discography =

- Studio albums: 18
- Extended plays: 4
- Live albums: 4
- Compilation albums: 6
- Singles: 37
- B-sides: 1
- Video albums: 5

This is the discography of English rock band James.

== Albums ==
=== Studio albums ===
Year	Details	Peak chart positions					Certifications (sales thresholds)
Year	Details	UK	AUS	CAN	SWE	US	Certifications (sales thresholds)
1986	Stutter: Released: 21 July 1986; Label: Blanco y Negro/Sire	68	—	—	—	—	
1988	Strip-mine: Released: 26 September 1988; Label: Blanco y Negro/Sire	90	—	—	—	—	
1990	Gold Mother^{1}: Released: 4 June 1990; Label: Fontana	2	174	—	—	—	BPI: Gold
1992	Seven: Released: 17 February 1992; Label: Fontana	2	123	—	45	—	BPI: Gold
1993	Laid: Released: 27 September 1993; Label: Fontana	3	86	—	—	72	BPI: Gold; RIAA: Gold
1994	Wah Wah: Released: 29 August 1994; Label: Mercury	11	—	—	—	—	
1997	Whiplash: Released: 24 February 1997; Label: Mercury	9	—	72	—	158	BPI: Gold
1999	Millionaires: Released: 11 October 1999; Label: Mercury	2	—	—	—	—	BPI: Gold
2001	Pleased to Meet You: Released: 2 July 2001; Label: Mercury	11	115	—	—	—	BPI: Silver
2008	Hey Ma: Released: 7 April 2008; Label: Fontana	10	—	—	—	—	
2010	The Night Before: Released: 19 April 2010; Label: Mercury	20	—	—	—	—	
2010	The Morning After: Released: 6 September 2010; Label: Mercury	19	—	—	—	—	
2014	La Petite Mort: Released: 2 June 2014; Label: Cooking Vinyl	11	—	—	—	—	
2016	Girl at the End of the World: Released: 18 March 2016; Label: BMG	2	—	—	—	—	
2018	Living in Extraordinary Times: Released: 3 August 2018; Label: Infectious Music	6	—	—	—	—	
2021	All the Colours of You: Released: 4 June 2021; Label: Virgin Music Label & Artist Services	3	—	—	—	—	
2023	Be Opened by the Wonderful: Released: 9 June 2023; Label: Nothing but Love Music	3	—	—	—	—	
2024	Yummy: Released: 12 April 2024; Label: Virgin	1	—	—	—	—	

^{1}Released as James in the US in 1991

=== Compilation albums ===
Year	Details	Peak chart positions			Certifications (sales thresholds)
Year	Details	UK	UK Indie	AUS	Certifications (sales thresholds)
1998	The Best Of: Released: 23 March 1998; Label: Mercury/Fontana	1	—	152	BPI: 3× Platinum
2001	B-Sides Ultra: Released: 3 December 2001; Label: Mercury	—	—	—	
2004	The Collection: Released: 11 October 2004; Label: Spectrum Music	—	3	—	BPI: Gold
2007	Fresh as a Daisy – The Singles: Released: 30 April 2007; Label: Mercury	12	—	—	BPI: Silver
2017	Justhipper (The Complete Sire & Blanc y Negro Recordings 1986–1988): Released: 28 July 2017; Label: Cherry Red Records	—	—	—	
2025	Nothing but Love: The Definitive Best Of: Released: 21 November 2025; Label: EMI, Mercury	6	—	—	

=== Live albums ===
Year	Details	Peak chart positions	
Year	Details	UK	UK Indie
1989	One Man Clapping: Released: March 1989; Label: One Man/Rough Trade	—	2
2002	Getting Away with It... Live: Released: 20 May 2002; Label: Sanctuary	102	—
2008	Live in 2008: Released: 8 December 2008; Label: Self-released	—	—
2020	Live in Extraordinary Times: Released: 11 December 2020; Label: Nothing But Love Music	31	—
2025	James, Live at the Acropolis: Released: 2 May 2025	27	2

== Extended plays ==
Year	Title	Peak chart positions	
Year	Title	UK	UK Indie
1983	Jimone: Released: November 1983; Label: Factory	—	10
1985	James II: Released: February 1985; Label: Factory	121	2
1985	Village Fire: Released: June 1985; Label: Factory	131	3
1986	Sit Down, three songs by... James: Released: March 1986; Label: Sire	93	—

== Singles ==
Year	Title	Peak chart positions									Certifications	Album
Year	Title	UK	UK Indie	AUS	AUT	GER	IRL	NLD	US	US Alt	Certifications	Album
1986	"Chain Mail"	93	—	—	—	—	—	—	—	—		Non-album single
1986	"So Many Ways"	143	—	—	—	—	—	—	—	—		Stutter
1988	"What For"	90	—	—	—	—	—	—	—	—		Strip-mine
1988	"Ya Ho"	137	—	—	—	—	—	—	—	—		Strip-mine
1989	"Sit Down"	77	2	141	—	—	—	—	—	—		Non-album single
1989	"Come Home" (Note: The original mix of "Come Home" was found on early pressings of Gold Mother.)	84	3	—	—	—	—	—	—	—		Gold Mother
1990	"How Was It for You?"	32	—	—	—	—	—	—	—	—		Gold Mother
1990	"Come Home" (Flood remix) (Note: The Flood remix of "Come Home" was found on later pressings of Gold Mother.)	32	—	—	—	—	—	—	—	—		Gold Mother
1990	"Lose Control" (Note: "Lose Control" was initially released as a non-album single, however it was added to later pressings of Gold Mother.)	38	—	—	—	—	—	—	—	—		Non-album singles
1991	"Sit Down" (re-recorded version) (Note: The 1991 version of "Sit Down" was initially released as a non-album singles, however it was added to later pressings of Gold Mother.)	2	—	—	27	56	5	42	—	9	BPI: 2× Platinum	Non-album singles
1991	"Sound"	9	—	28	—	—	15	—	—	—		Seven
1992	"Born of Frustration"	13	—	134	—	—	—	69	—	5	BPI: Silver	Seven
1992	"Ring the Bells"	37	—	—	—	—	—	—	—	—		Seven
1992	"Seven"	46	—	—	—	—	—	—	—	—		Seven
1993	"Sometimes"	18	—	139	—	—	—	—	—	—	BPI: Silver	Laid
1993	"Laid"	25	—	40	—	—	—	—	61	3	BPI: Platinum	Laid
1994	"Jam J" / "Say Something"	24	—	119	—	—	—	—	—	19	BPI: Silver	Wah Wah / Laid
1997	"She's a Star"	9	—	149	—	—	—	—	—	—	BPI: Silver	Whiplash
1997	"Tomorrow"	12	—	—	—	—	—	—	—	—		Whiplash
1997	"Waltzing Along"	23	—	—	—	—	—	—	—	—		Whiplash
1998	"Destiny Calling"	17	—	—	—	—	—	—	—	—		The Best of James
1998	"Runaground"	29	—	—	—	—	—	—	—	—		The Best of James
1998	"Sit Down '98"	7	—	—	—	—	—	—	—	—		Non-album single
1999	"I Know What I'm Here For"	22	—	—	—	—	—	—	—	—		Millionaires
1999	"Just Like Fred Astaire"	17	—	—	—	—	—	—	—	—		Millionaires
1999	"We're Going to Miss You"	48	—	—	—	—	—	—	—	—		Millionaires
2001	"Getting Away with It (All Messed Up)"	22	—	—	—	—	—	—	—	—		Pleased to Meet You
2008	"Whiteboy"	—	—	—	—	—	—	—	—	—		Hey Ma
2008	"Waterfall"	—	—	—	—	—	—	—	—	—		Hey Ma
2010	"Not So Strong"	—	—	—	—	—	—	—	—	—		Non-album single
2014	"Frozen Britain"	—	—	—	—	—	—	—	—	—		La Petite Mort
2014	"Moving On"	—	15	—	—	—	—	—	—	—		La Petite Mort
2014	"Curse Curse"	—	—	—	—	—	—	—	—	—		La Petite Mort
2014	"All I'm Saying"	—	—	—	—	—	—	—	—	—		La Petite Mort
2015	"To My Surprise"	—	—	—	—	—	—	—	—	—		Girl at the End of the World
2016	"Nothing But Love"	—	—	—	—	—	—	—	—	—		Girl at the End of the World
2016	"Girl at the End of the World"	—	—	—	—	—	—	—	—	—		Girl at the End of the World
2016	"Dear John"	—	—	—	—	—	—	—	—	—		Girl at the End of the World
2018	Better Than That (EP)	—	–	—	—	—	—	—	—	—		Living in Extraordinary Times
2018	"Coming Home (Pt.2)"	—	—	—	—	—	—	—	—	—		Living in Extraordinary Times
2018	"Many Faces"	—	—	—	—	—	—	—	—	—		Living in Extraordinary Times
2021	"All the Colours of You"	—	—	—	—	—	—	—	—	—		All the Colours of You
2021	"Beautiful Beaches"	—	—	—	—	—	—	—	—	—		All the Colours of You
2021	"Recover"	—	—	—	—	—	—	—	—	—		All the Colours of You
2021	"Isabella"	—	—	—	—	—	—	—	—	—		All the Colours of You

=== Promotional singles ===
Year	Title	Album
2007	"Who Are You"	Fresh As A Daisy - The Singles

== Videography ==
=== Video albums ===
Year	Title	Format
1991	Come Home Live	VHS
1992	Seven: Live Concert	VHS
2002	Getting Away With It... Live	DVD
2007	Fresh as a Daisy – The Videos	DVD
2020	Live in Extraordinary Times	DVD
2025	James, Live at the Acropolis	DVD

=== Music videos ===
Year	Title	Director
1986	"So Many Ways"	
1988	"What For"	
1989	"Sit Down"	Edward Barton
1990	"How Was It for You"	Swivel
1990	"Come Home"	
1990	"Lose Control"	
1991	"Sound"	Peter Scammell
1992	"Born of Frustration"	Peter Scammell
1992	"Ring the Bells"	Peter Scammell
1992	"Seven"	
1993	"Sometimes (Lester Piggott)"	Tim Pope
1993	"Laid"	Zanna
1993	"Say Something"	Peter Care
1997	"She's a Star"	David Mould
1997	"Tomorrow"	Kevin Godley
1997	"Waltzing Along"	John Hardwick
1998	"Runaground"	Mary Scanlon
1998	"Destiny Calling"	Alex Hemming
1998	"Sit Down '98"	
1999	"I Know What I'm Here For"	David Mould
1999	"Just Like Fred Astaire"	John Hillcoat
1999	"We're Going to Miss You"	John Hardwick
2001	"Getting Away with It (All Messed Up)"	Gordon Main; Rob Leggatt; Simon Earith
2014	"Frozen Britain"	Roger Sargent
2014	"Moving On"	Ainslie Henderson
2014	"Curse Curse"	Alberto Almeida
2014	"All I'm Saying"	Péter Vácz
2015	"To My Surprise"	Kris Merc
2016	"Nothing But Love"	James FitzGerald
2016	"Girl at the End of the World"	Kris Merc
2016	"Dear John"	Péter Vácz
2018	"Coming Home (Pt.2)"	Leif Tilden
