= The Best Of (James album) =

The Best of James

Greatest hits album by James
- Released: 23 March 1998
- Recorded: 1984–1997
- Genre: Alternative rock
- Length: 69:19
- Label: Mercury/Fontana

James chronology
Whiplash (1997)	The Best of James (1998)	Millionaires (1999)

Singles from The Best of James
- 1. "Destiny Calling" Released: 9 March 1998; 2. "Runaground" Released: 25 May 1998

The Best Of is the first compilation album by English rock band James, released in 1998. It contains singles from the band's studio albums Gold Mother (1990), Seven (1992), Laid (1993), Whiplash (1997), plus one track from the EP James II (1985) and two new tracks. The compilation reached number one in the UK Albums Chart.

== Reception ==
Professional ratings
Review scores
Source	Rating
AllMusic	4/5 stars
Q	5/5 stars

In a review for AllMusic, Stephen Thomas Erlewine gave the album four out of five stars, describing it as "An imperfect collection of a frustratingly uneven band" and "a tantalizing missed opportunity", opining that the album's lack of chronological order made it "difficult to listen to [the] songs". Despite this, he went on to say that "no other James album accurately conveys [the band's] eclecticism or their musical strengths".

Awarding the album five out of five stars, Q magazine's John Aizlewood observed that "They're as stubborn (another admirable James trait) as disenfranchised mules; their audience is not growing (Whiplash sold 150,000) and they've influenced precisely nobody, but every track here – including new songs 'Runaground' and 'Destiny Calling, which unveil the mature James: "Tell us when our time is up/Show us how to die well/Show us how to let it all go" – bristles with inspiration."

Clash included "Destiny Calling" on their list of the top 10 best James songs.

== Track listing ==
All tracks written by James, except where noted.

No.	Title	Writer(s)	Origin	Length
1.	"Come Home" (Flood mix; 1991 re-release)		Gold Mother	3:55
2.	"Sit Down" (1991 re-release)	Tim Booth; Larry Gott; Jim Glennie; Gavan Whelan	Gold Mother	4:04
3.	"She's a Star"		Whiplash	3:40
4.	"Laid"		Laid	2:36
5.	"Waltzing Along" (single version)		Whiplash	3:36
6.	"Say Something"		Laid	3:25
7.	"Born of Frustration" (Best-of Edit)		Seven	4:36
8.	"Tomorrow"	James; Brian Eno	Whiplash	3:41
9.	"Destiny Calling"		previously unreleased	3:50
10.	"Out to Get You"		Laid	4:26
11.	"Runaground"		previously unreleased	4:09
12.	"Lose Control" (1991 re-release)		Gold Mother	3:55
13.	"Sometimes" (Best-of Edit)		Laid	4:37
14.	"How Was It for You" (Single Edit)		Gold Mother	2:57
15.	"Seven"		Seven	3:19
16.	"Sound" (Best-of Edit)		Seven	4:58
17.	"Ring the Bells"		Seven	4:43
18.	"Hymn from a Village"	Booth; Gott; Glennie; Whelan	James II	2:52

A limited-edition version contains a second CD of live material, recorded at Whitfield St Studios in London on 21 January 1998:

1. "Runaground"
2. "Ring the Bells"
3. "Out to Get You"
4. "Johnny Yen"
5. "Lose Control"
6. "Laid"
7. "Sound"

== Charts ==
=== Weekly charts ===
Chart (1998)	Peak position
Australian Albums (ARIA)	152
Scottish Albums (OCC)	1
UK Albums (OCC)	1

=== Year-end charts ===
Chart (1998)	Position
UK Albums (OCC)	26

== Certifications ==
Region	Certification	Certified units/sales
United Kingdom (BPI)	3× Platinum	900,000^{‡}
^{‡} Sales+streaming figures based on certification alone.
