= All the Colours of You =

Studio album by James
- Released: 4 June 2021
- Studio: Jacknife Lee's home studio, Topanga Canyon, California
- Genre: Stadium rock; electronic
- Length: 49:04
- Label: Virgin Music Label & Artist Services
- Producer: Jacknife Lee

James chronology
Living in Extraordinary Times (2018)	All the Colours of You (2021)	Be Opened by the Wonderful (2023)

Singles from All the Colours of You
- 1. "All the Colours of You" Released: 1 March 2021; 2. "Beautiful Beaches" Released: 19 April 2021; 3. "Recover" Released: 5 May 2021; 4. "Isabella" Released: 19 May 2021

All the Colours of You is the 16th studio album of English rock band James that was released on 4 June 2021 through Virgin Music Label & Artist Services. James began writing the album before the release of their 15th studio album Living in Extraordinary Times (2018); they accumulated 100 Jam sessions. Due to the COVID-19 pandemic and the resulting lockdowns, the band members were stuck in different countries. Vocalist Tim Booth began working with producer Jacknife Lee at his studio in Topanga Canyon, California, where Booth acted as a liaison between the band and Lee. The album has been described as a stadium rock and electronic; its songs were influenced by the pandemic, the lockdowns, and the murder of George Floyd.

Music critics gave All the Colours of You generally positive reviews; some of them complimented Lee's production and noted the album's anthemic nature. It peaked at number three in the United Kingdom, and charted in Germany, Ireland, Portugal, Scotland, and Switzerland. "All the Colours of You" was released as the album's lead single on 1 March 2021, and the tracks "Beautiful Beaches", "Recover", "Isabella" were released as follow-up singles over the next two months. James played several festivals in the UK in August and September 2021, and ended the year with a UK arena tour with Happy Mondays. A tour of Portugal in April 2022 was followed by more UK festival performances throughout June 2022.

== Background and writing ==
James released their 15th studio album Living in Extraordinary Times in August 2018. Two weeks prior to its release, the band's four songwriters in the band had assembled at a house in the Yorkshire Dales, north-east England, to start writing the follow-up. Living in Extraordinary Times was promoted with tours of Australia, Europe—including a co-headlining United Kingdom tour with The Charlatans—New Zealand, South America, and the United States—a co-headlining tour with the Psychedelic Furs). The cycle saw the introduction of new member Deborah Knox-Hewson, who was subsequently replaced by her friend Chloe Alper.

In June 2019, bassist Jim Glennie said the band had a remaining writing session before they intended to do any major editing with the aim of release an album the following year. Booth said the band wanted to focus on grooves and explore sounds they had not previously explored, such as contemporary psychedelia. In early 2020, at the outbreak of the COVID-19 pandemic, the band had accumulated 100 Jam sessions in 17 days; they were halfway through a planned year-long break from touring. They made demos and wrote lyrics in preparation for their next album. Before the pandemic, the members worked on demos in their own studios or met in pairs and worked together for a few days. The lockdowns resulting from the pandemic isolated members of the band in different countries. They used the video-conferencing software Zoom to discuss how to continue working towards the new album.

== Production ==
Booth, Glennie, keyboardist Mark Hunter, and Glennie's brother Peter did pre-production. James had planned to record their next album in the UK with Charlie Andrew, who had produced their previous album. After a member suggested working with Jacknife Lee, they learnt he was living within two miles (3.2 km) of vocalist Tim Booth in Topanga Canyon, California. Booth called Lee and visited him; they talked and Booth showed him demos he liked. Due to COVID-19 travel restrictions, Booth was the only member of James working in Lee's home studio. During a trial session, Lee created what would become the intro to "All the Colours of You". The band members loved the intro, and Lee was engaged as the album's producer.

Lee, Matt Bishop and Hunter acted as engineers during the recording process, with editing by Bishop, and additional engineering from Beni Giles, Matthew Walsh, and Matt Glaseby. Lee is an experienced mixer who edited the band's demos, adding loops, providing electronic textures, and changing the structures. Booth served as an intermediary between Lee and the rest of the band; whenever they needed a part, such as a trumpet, he would contact trumpeter Andy Diagram, who would record it and send it to the pair. Lee mixed the recordings and John Davis mastered the album at Metropolis in London.

== Composition and lyrics ==
The sound of All the Colours of You has been described as stadium rock and electronic. According to QRO editor Ted Chase, James has an "emotional stadium size more akin to big eighties outfits from when they got their start, than either the slamming pop or intimate indie of today". Booth, who wrote the band's lyrics, cited the COVID-19 pandemic, the resulting lockdowns, and the murder of George Floyd as influences on the topics covered on the album. All of the music was written between Booth, guitarist and violinist Saul Davies, Glennie, Hunter, and Lee. Drummer David Baynton-Power does not appear on the album; Lee played his parts in the majority of the songs, and Bishop performed on "Beautiful Beaches" and "Wherever It Takes Us". Lee also played guitar and keyboards on every track, background vocals on five songs, and bass guitar on "Hush". Giles, who had worked on the previous album, played keyboards on "Zero" and "Beautiful Beaches". Peter Glennie sang background vocals on "Zero", and played EBow on "All the Colours of You", strings on "Magic Bus", and cello on "Isabella".

All the Colours of You's opening track "Zero" talks about death and warns the listener to not worry about their remaining time. Its opening lyric "We're all going to die", which Booth changed due to COVID-19, was originally "We're all going to shine"; he said in spite of the alteration, he "discovered the song was still uplifting". The slow-tempo electronic song starts with ambient sounds, and a gentle piano-and-guitar part guides the rest of its runtime. "All the Colours of You" criticises the presidency of Donald Trump, which Booth observed while living in the US; the track was partially influenced by the protests that followed the murder of George Floyd. The song's mix of guitars and dance music earned it a comparison to the work of New Order and to James' own song "Ring the Bells", which appears on their fourth studio album Seven (1992). "Recover" is a tribute Booth's father-in-law Saville Shela, who died as a result of COVID-19 in April 2020. Its minimalist instrumentations and Booth's intimate vocals were attributed to Lee's production style and earned a comparison to the work of Muse. Grace Galarraga of mxdwn said the track details the "middle part of quarantine, where people realised that 'nature needs a break' and people were all 'out of a job.'" "Beautiful Beaches" is a pop song about climate change; its outro features distorted drums similar to the ones heard in "It Might Be Time" (2019) by Tame Impala. It was inspired by a dream Booth had after meeting a Peruvian shaman in which he imagined earthquakes, fires, and "all hell breaking loose in California". The morning after the dream, a wildfire was blazing through California, which caused Booth and his family to evacuate their home.

"Beautiful Beaches" transitions into "Wherever It Takes" with the aid of a synth bass. "Whatever it takes" was inspired by Booth's nightmares about a friend who went to Portland, Oregon, to protest the murder of George Floyd. It is reminiscent of the band's Brian Eno-produced sixth album Wah Wah (1994), with ambient sounds, a pseudo-spoken vocal delivery from Booth, house piano and a choir-led chorus. It was comparison to "Once in a Lifetime" (1980) by Talking Heads with its sermon-like vocal delivery and big chorus. "Hush" is about a ghost that haunts the person responsible for his death; according to Booth; "the ghost isn’t really a malevolent ghost because he quite likes being dead, so he just keeps [the killer] awake by humming". It is techno-driven electronica track that evokes "Five O", a track from the band's fifth studio album Laid (1993). "Miss America" discusses the US from the viewpoint of a beauty pageant. Booth wanted the title to be multi-layered, referring to him leaving the country and to President Donald Trump's hosting of pageants. Its middle portion consists of gunshots, screams and speeches from demonstrations. "Getting Myself Into" channels the indie sound of James's earliest material; "Magic Bus" is a dance-pop song. "Isabella" was the first song written for the album, and was originally known as "Yorkshire Day 1, Jam 2". Davies made a 15-minute demo of the jam, which confused the other band members, who felt it was too long. The violin part was swapped for a choral section that includes Davies' children Mia and Vincent, and Bryony Ross. Booth said the track deals with a person who is involved with a "freedom-loving lass" who breaks up with them. The album's closing track "XYST" opens with guitars in the style of R.E.M., which gives way to electronic drums and Booth's slow vocal delivery. Feedback from the guitars increases, leading into a group vocal-driven chorus recalling Mylo Xyloto (2011)-era Coldplay.

== Release ==
On 1 March 2021, All the Colours of You was announced for release in three months' time. Alongside this, "All the Colours of You" was released as its lead single. "Beautiful Beaches" was released as the album's second single on 19 April 2021. The third single "Recover" was released on 5 May 2021; and the fourth, "Isabella", was released on 19 May 2021. All the Colours of You was released on 4 June 2021 through Virgin Music Label & Artist Services; the digital deluxe edition includes demos of "Where It Takes Us", "Life", and "Isabella", and live performances of "Beautiful Beaches" and "Getting Myself Into". According to multi-instrumentalist Saul Davies, the album would likely have been released in February 2021 had it not been affected by the pandemic. On the same day, the band performed a radio session for Absolute Radio in which they played "All the Colours of You", "Beautiful Beaches" and "Getting Myself Into".

A music video for "Getting Myself Into" that Mark Oulson-Jenkins directed was released on 7 June 2021. It was filmed at Broughton Hall Estate in the Yorkshire Dales and is the first video to include the entire band since 1999. Booth and his wife were friends with the hall's owners Roger Tempest and Paris Ackrill, who Booth had told the band would rehearse in a London studio but Tempest suggested they use his house. Knox-Hewson returned to the band, expanding it to a nine-piece, leading up to the album's touring cycle. Following a one-off show in Oxford, James performed at several UK festivals in August and September 2021, including Beautiful Days, Isle of Wight and Playground. In November 2021, the band released The Campfire EP, a four-track Extended Play (EP) featuring re-recorded versions of "Recover", "Miss America" and "Magic Bus"; the EP was recorded at Broughton Hall Estate. James then embarked on an arena tour of the UK with Happy Mondays in November and December 2021. Following a tour of Portugal in April 2022, the band played festival and standalone shows in the UK in June 2022, leading to a performance at Castlefield Bowl in Castlefield. Several festival appearances across Europe followed, ending with a performance at Visor Fest in Spain in September that year.

== Reception ==
Professional ratings
Aggregate scores
Source	Rating
AnyDecentMusic?	6.9/10
Review scores
Source	Rating
The Arts Desk	3/5 stars
Clash	8/10
Gigwise	4/10 stars
God Is in the TV	8/10 stars
Mojo	4/5 stars
musicOMH	3.5/5 stars
PopMatters	6/10
Record Collector	4/5 stars
Uncut	7/10
Under the Radar	8/10 stars

All the Colours of You was met with generally favourable reviews from music critics. AnyDecentMusic? gave it a score of 6.9, based on 10 reviews.

Several reviewers praised the album's production. Louder Than War writer Iain Key complimented Lee's "polished, but not superficial, cinematic and turned up to 11" production style. Mojo's John Aizlewood also praised Lee's ability, which he said gives "these big songs the big production they need". The Arts Desk journalist Nick Hasted said Lee's "sleek burnishing and mild deconstruction" production "help[s] James still sound big if not exactly contemporary". God Is in the TV contributor Laura Dean highlighted Hunter's "influence and talent [as] shin[ing] brightly throughout the entirety of the album". In lieu of the way it was recorded, she liked the band's ability to make "a solid album that reflects the talents of each member" while "continually experimenting with their sound and always challenging both themselves and their fans".

A few reviewers were dismissive of the album. PopMatters writer Gary Schwind called it a "complex album" that is not "easy to classify", and said while some tracks would work in a film soundtrack, there is "no song you find yourself singing after you've listened to the album a couple of times". Gigwise's Tom Dibb wrote James are "woefully out of step" with the album because its musical palette seems "muddled and confused in today’s modern musical landscape"; and that it "fails to hit the mark ... [and] already sounds dated and misguided".

Other critics viewed All the Colours of You in the context of the band's whole career and admired its anthemic sound. Emma Harrison of Clash wrote the album "might just be their strongest offering to date", saying there were glimmers of James' old sound "in parts" because it "takes the band into a new sonic adventure where you hear lo-if leanings and pumping club beats". According to Key, in spite of the band's longevity, "it's unmistakably still James ... sound[ing] bigger than anything that's come before". Under the Radar's Matt Raven wrote All the Colours of You is a "super satisfying musical experience that solidifies an illustrious 35-year career ... making a distinctive brand of creative rock music with rich textures and shrewd melodies", while Record Collector reviewer Kevin Harley noted that the band "channel their founding exploratory impetus into exultant, reflective and wide-ranging new shapes". Andrew Mueller of Uncut and musicOMH contributor John Murphy highlighted the anthemic sound, with the latter writing that it is "very much in that James vein – full of stirring anthems that you can imagine being belted out in the arenas of the country", with a "freshness" their peers lack. Aside from some of the album's weakest songs towards its end, he noted the "energy and way with a chorus that would shame bands half their age".

All the Colours of You charted at number two in the UK Albums Midweek Chart, selling 9,817 copies, eventually peaking at number three on the main UK Albums Chart. It also charted at number two in Scotland, number eight in Portugal, number 66 in Switzerland, number 83 in Ireland, and number 98 in Germany. Clash included "All the Colours of You" on their list of the top 10 best James songs.

== Track listing ==
All lyrics by Tim Booth, all music written by Booth, Saul Davies, Jim Glennie, Mark Hunter, and Jacknife Lee. All recordings produced by Lee.

1. "Zero" – 5:42
2. "All the Colours of You" – 5:26
3. "Recover" – 3:44
4. "Beautiful Beaches" – 5:14
5. "Wherever It Takes Us" – 5:05
6. "Hush" – 4:23
7. "Miss America" – 4:02
8. "Getting Myself Into" – 3:27
9. "Magic Bus" – 3:01
10. "Isabella" – 4:23
11. "XYST" – 4:37

== Personnel ==
Personnel per booklet.

James

- Tim Booth – lead vocals, background vocals (tracks 1, 2 and 6–11)
- Jim Glennie – bass guitar (tracks 1–5 and 7–10), background vocals (track 5)
- Saul Davies – guitar (all except track 3), violin (tracks 3, 6, 7 and 10), background vocals (tracks 5 and 10)
- Mark Hunter – keyboards, background vocals (track 5)
- Andy Diagram – trumpet (tracks 1–3 and 7), background vocals (track 5), horns (track 10)
- Adrian Oxaal – guitar (tracks 1, 10 and 11), background vocals (tracks 5)
- Chloe Alper – background vocals (tracks 2, 4, 5, 7 and 9–11)

Additional musicians

- Jacknife Lee – guitar, keyboards, drums (tracks 1–3 and 6–11), background vocals (tracks 2, 3, 5, 7 and 11), bass guitar (track 6), programming
- Beni Giles – keyboards (tracks 1 and 4)
- Peter Glennie – background vocals (track 1), EBow (track 2), strings (track 9), cellos (track 10)
- Collette Byrn – background vocals (track 1)
- Matt Bishop – drums (tracks 4 and 5)
- Kate Shela – background vocals (track 4)
- Mia Davies – background vocals (tracks 9 and 10)
- Vincent Davies – background vocals (track 10)
- Bryony Ross – background vocals (track 10)

Production and design

- Jacknife Lee – producer, mixing, engineer
- Matt Bishop – engineer, editing
- Mark Hunter – engineer, pre-production
- Tim Booth – production overseer, pre-production
- Jim Glennie – pre-production
- Peter Glennie – pre-production
- Beni Giles – additional engineering
- Matthew Walsh – additional engineering
- Matt Glaseby – additional engineering
- John Davis – mastering
- Matt de Jong – visual creative direction
- Jamie-James Medina – visual creative direction

== Charts ==
Chart performance for All the Colours of You
Chart (2021)	Peak position
German Albums (Offizielle Top 100)	98
Irish Albums (IRMA)	83
Portuguese Albums (AFP)	8
Scottish Albums (OCC)	2
Swiss Albums (Schweizer Hitparade)	66
UK Albums (OCC)	3
