= Laid (album) =

1993 album by James

Studio album by James
- Released: 27 September 1993
- Recorded: February–March 1993
- Studios: The Windings, Wrexham, Wales; Real World, Box, Wiltshire
- Genres: Folk; pop rock
- Length: 55:30
- Label: Fontana
- Producer: Brian Eno

James chronology
Seven (1992)	Laid (1993)	Wah Wah (1994)

Singles from Laid
- 1. "Sometimes (Lester Piggott)" Released: 30 August 1993; 2. "Laid" Released: 1 November 1993

Laid is the fifth studio album by British rock band James. It was released on 27 September 1993 through Fontana Records. The album's sound, which is "stripped-down" compared to their prior releases, was inspired by their recent experience touring as supporting act to Neil Young. Enlisting Brian Eno as producer, James recorded for six weeks at The Windings in Wrexham, Wales, and Real World Studios in Box, Wiltshire. The sessions also resulted in the experimental sixth studio album Wah Wah (1994). Laid is a folk and pop rock album that was reminiscent of their earlier releases with its atmosphere and minimal arrangements.

The album's lead single, "Sometimes (Lester Piggott)", was released on 30 August 1993. Bolstered by the song's success, James toured the US as part of the WOMAD festival. "Laid" was released as the album's second single on 1 November 1993. The band toured the UK the following month, supported Duran Duran in the US, and finally embarked on their own US tour. Laid has been re-pressed on vinyl three times; it was reissued on CD in 2001, in 2015 as a standalone release, and as part of a box set with Wah Wah. The album received generally positive reviews from music critics, many of whom commented on Eno's production. It peaked at number three in the UK and charted in Australia and the US. It was later certified gold in the UK and the US, as was the eponymous track in the UK. "Sometimes (Lester Piggott)" and "Laid" both charted in the UK top 40 and "Laid" peaked at number 67 on the Hot 100. Laid appeared on best-of album lists compiled by Les Inrockuptibles, NME and Select, while the eponymous song appeared on best-song-of-the-decade lists by PopMatters and uDiscoverMusic.

== Background and writing ==
James's fourth studio album Seven, which was released in February 1992, sold a million copies worldwide. It peaked at number two in the UK with three of its four singles – "Sound", "Born of Frustration", and "Ring the Bells" – reaching the top 40 of the UK singles chart. "Born of Frustration" was successful on the United States Billboard Alternative Airplay chart, where it reached number five. The band headlined their only United Kingdom show of 1992 to a crowd of 30,000 at the Alton Towers leisure park.

Following this, trumpeter Andy Diagram, who wanted to have other opportunities and missed his girlfriend, left the band, which continued as a six-piece outfit. James supported Neil Young on nine of his US west-coast shows with an acoustic set. They continued touring the US, playing acoustic instead of electric shows as they had intended. Their record company was angered by this decision and threatened to withdraw funding for the tour, but changed their mind after a staff member attended a show. After returning to the UK, James started writing material for their next album.

== Production ==
James wanted to work with producer Brian Eno since their debut studio album Stutter (1986). Vocalist Tim Booth said Eno was "a bit busy and he'd call back in a couple of years." The band sent Eno a letter and six hours' worth of rehearsal tapes. Eno listened to the tapes while on holiday after his wife said she was a fan of James. He became interested in the band after hearing a rough version of "Sometimes (Lester Piggott)". In August 1992, Eno telephoned the band, saying he liked their music and went to the UK to work with them. In early 1993, Eno and engineer Benedict Fenner visited the band at their practice space, Beehive Mill in Manchester, to witness their productivity over three-to-four days. Eno made recordings of the rehearsals to assess the quality of the songwriting. Recording for Laid began in February 1993, initially for one week at drummer David Baynton-Power's studio The Windings in Wrexham, then five more weeks at Real World Studios in Box, Wiltshire. In comparison to Seven, which took several months to record, the six-week recording schedule was intended to provoke spontaneity and capitalized on Eno's limited availability of four days a week.

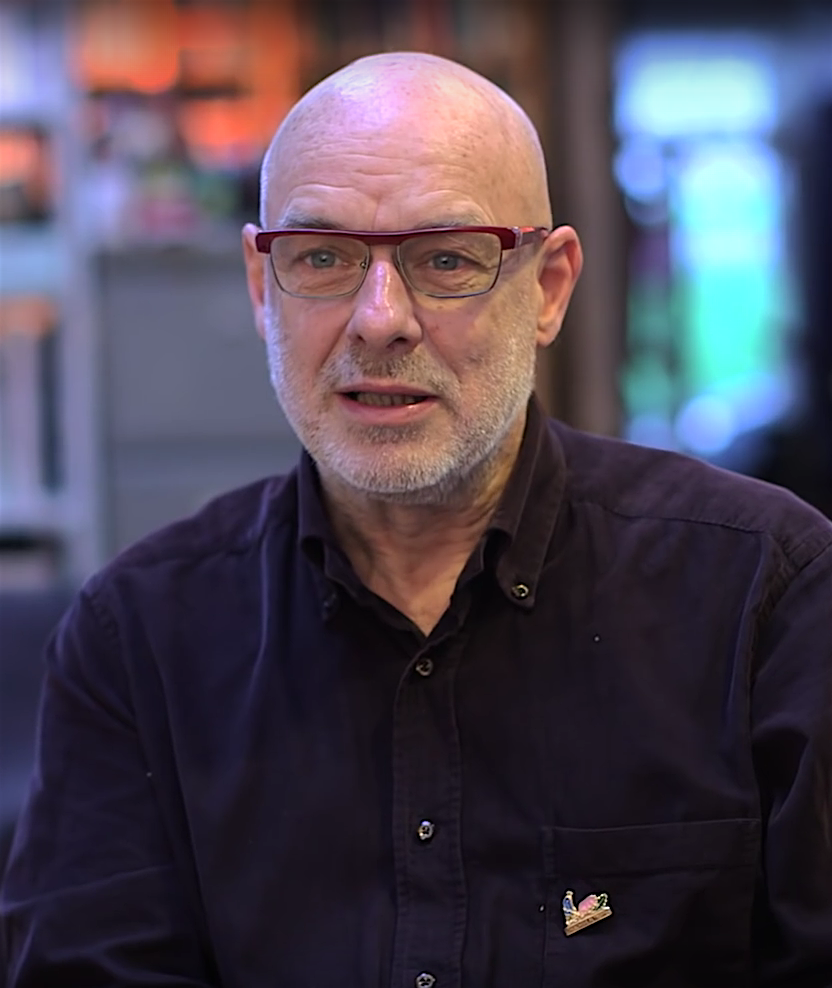
Brian Eno assisted in the album's production.

Eno arrived at the studio two hours earlier than everyone else so he could listen to the rehearsal tapes. From the hours of recordings, Eno picked out potential ideas he wanted expanded into fully-produced songs. Booth said some of the ideas lasted as little as 20 seconds, and that "Skindiving" and "Dream Thrum" grew from these ideas. Booth said Eno felt the band "completely neglected" the songs "Dream Thrum", "Laid", and "Five-O". Fenner handled most of the recording; he and Eno were assisted by engineer Ben 'Jude' Findlay. "P.S." was recorded by Steve 'Doc' Williams with assistance from Mike Jones and additional recording by Fenner. One day, when Eno was not in the studio, guitarist Larry Gott took on his role and the band recorded "One of the Three", which Eno did not like. During the sessions, Eno had a second studio set up so the band could experiment during downtime. The results of this were later released as the album Wah Wah (1994). Gott said Eno had tapes continuously recording during the process in case they came up with an idea they liked. Bassist Jim Glennie said Eno often encouraged them to experiment, making them "realise that this imperfection was a good thing". Fenner mixed most of the recordings except for "Everybody Knows" and "Low Low Low", both of which were mixed by Markus Dravs.

== Composition and lyrics ==
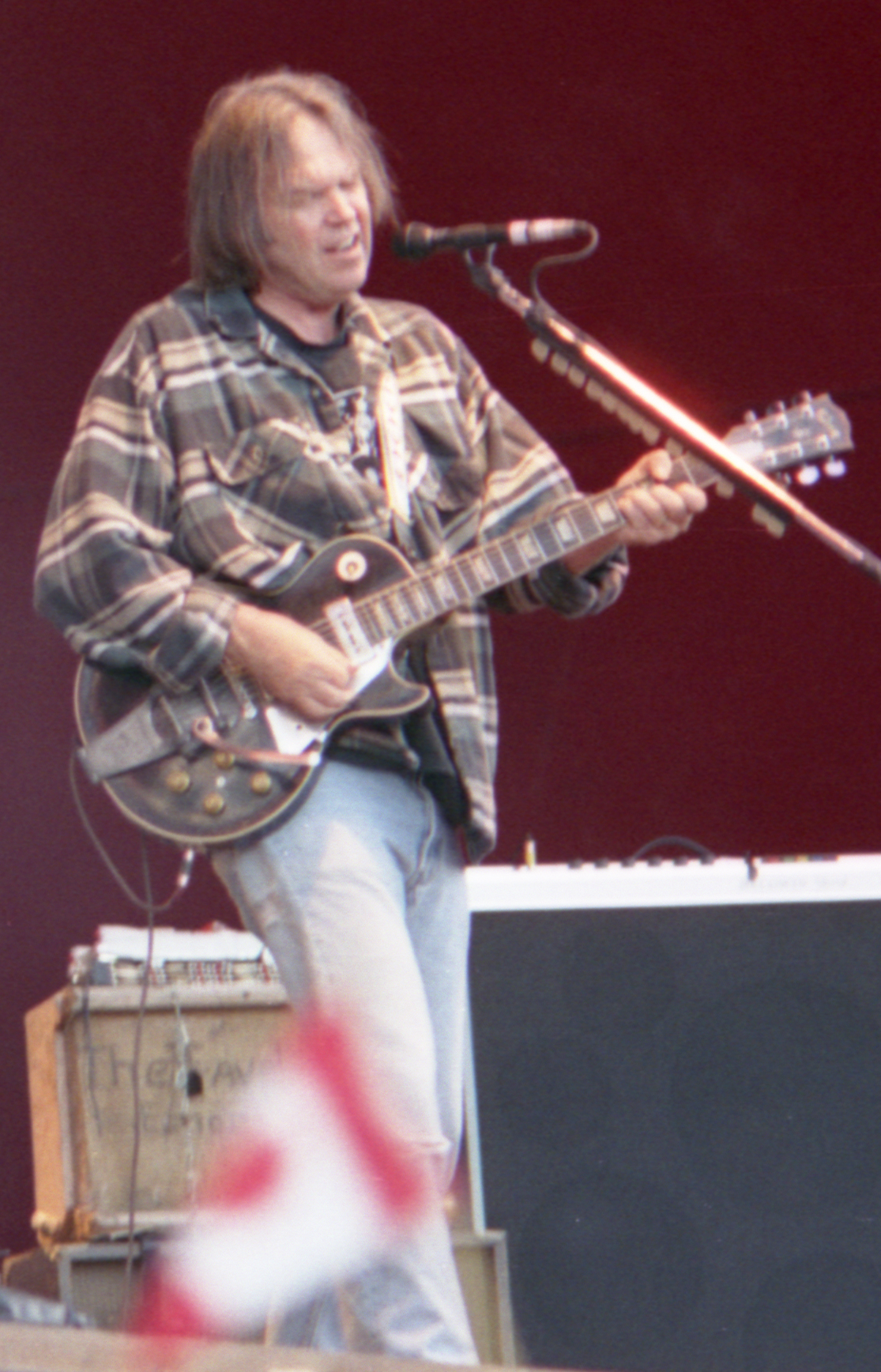
The 1992 supporting tour for Neil Young influenced Laid's overall stripped-down sound.

The folk and pop rock sound of Laid recalls the band's earlier material and has a dreamier atmosphere with sparse arrangements. Booth said the band's acoustic touring with Young influenced the album; "You're naked, you're vulnerable, but it's exhilarating ... It's not an acoustic record, but it's a stripped down sound". Eno contributed additional bass and keyboards to the recordings; he and Martine McDonagh, the band's manager and Booth's former partner, sang additional vocals on "Sometimes (Lester Piggott)", "Dream Thrum", and "Five-O".

"Out to Get You" was originally recorded as the B-side to "Lose Control" (1990), which James forgot about until reviving it for the tour with Young. When they were working on the song in the studio, the band attempted to add overdubs. Booth said this changed the feeling of the track so they reverted to the first take of the song. "Out to Get You" sets the tone for the rest of album with Glennie's octave notes, Gott's blues-lite guitar parts, and minimal percussion from Baynton-Power. The song's first-person narrator rues a love over which he is paranoid. "Sometimes (Lester Piggott)" is the most rock-centric track on the album with its fast-paced acoustic strumming. The "Lester Piggott" part is inspired by the jockey of the same name, which Booth said was "because it has a racing beat". During recording, Eno "went white and sat down" as Booth sang, later stating he had "just experienced one of the highlights of my musical life". Booth had difficulty writing lyrics he liked for "Dream Thrum". He eventually settled on talking about the effect of culture on individual personality and life choices. It is the only song on album on which keyboardist Mark Hunter played another instrument (a melodica) as well as keyboards.

"One of the Three" is inspired by the experiences of John McCarthy, Brian Keenan, and Terry Waite, who were taken as hostages in Lebanon, and by a scene in Waiting for Godot (1953) in which three characters are on crosses. The band subdued the sound of the pop-leaning "Say Something" because they felt it would be distasteful to put too much emotion behind it. The song, which was written by Booth after an argument, discusses first love and is indebted to the work of U2.

The folk influenced track "Five-O" is about a belief in the narrator's partner in a long-term relationship. "P.S.", which is about a failing relationship, is a demo recording the band felt they could not improve upon; the full version ran for eight minutes before it was reduced. "Everybody Knows" is about helping a depressed person; Glennie said it was planned to appear on Wah Wah but was moved to Laid because the band wanted crossover between releases. "Knuckle Too Far" evolved from a jam session the band had with Bruce Mitchell of the Durutti Column. Originally known as "Bruce Jam," Glennie said this version was "very sparse with nothing going on". The band forgot about the song for nine months. As the band struggled to reinvent it in the studio, they thought about putting that version on the album. Finally, Booth and Gott, unable to hear each other through their monitors, ran through the song again and ended up with a satisfactory version through what Gott described as "this curious kind of miscommunication".

Booth said "Low Low Low" was influenced by the idea only one gene separates humans from apes; he said, "I swing from seeing human beings as apes to seeing them as divine depending on what day you catch me". The song's chorus includes catering staff of Real World – dubbed the Kitchenettes – singing in unison. "Laid" features Gott on slide guitar for the first time since "Really Heard" from Stutter. The song, which comments on sexuality, was inspired by Booth witnessing several relationships that were happening around him. The band initially discarded the song for sounding too much like pop until Eno encouraged the band to continue working on it. Booth's rushed vocals are the result of attempting to encapsulate "that feeling of an intense relationship [that is] out of control". The version that appeared on the album is an early demo that was recorded at The Windings. "Lullaby", which was originally called "Just Human", tackles the effects of child abuse suffered by a friend of Booth's. The album closes with "Skindiving", an ambient track that is about a person delving deeply into a certain frame of mind.

== Release ==
Partway through the recording process, James played a one-off show in Bath, Somerset, where they debuted many of the album's tracks. James supported Young at Finsbury Park, London, on 8 July 1993. The band then performed at the WOMAD festival on 28 August 1993 and travelled across the US with the festival. "Sometimes (Lester Piggott)" was released as a single on 30 August 1993 with "America" and "Building a Charge" as extra tracks. The music video for "Sometimes (Lester Piggott)" was directed by Tim Pope. It expanded on the song's water theme and depicts the band miming the lyrics in a water tank at Pinewood Studios. McDonagh starred in the video, standing in as an extra guitarist.

Laid was released in the UK on 27 September 1993 through Fontana Records. The album's cover artwork depicts the band members wearing dresses and eating bananas in front of the Marseille Cathedral in Marseille, France. James were on a three-day photograph session when Booth suggested they put on dresses for a few pictures. They snacked on bananas as they awaited their manager's return with food. Despite having already-completed cover art, they decided to use the images from Marseille once they saw them. Glennie joked the audience "could read into it as a subtext about prostituting ourselves by selling what we do".

Booth and Eno wanted the outtake "The Lake" on Laid but were outvoted by the rest of the band. The song, as well as "America", was included on the Japanese edition of the album. "Laid" was released as a single with "Wah Wah Kits", "The Lake", and "Seconds Away" on 1 November 1993. The following week, a second version of the single, including live versions of "Laid", "Five-O", "Say Something", and "Sometimes (Lester Piggott)," was released. Zanna directed the music video for "Laid", in which Booth is handcuffed in a laundromat as the other band members enter and leave. In December 1993, the band went on their first tour of the UK in two years. In January 1994, the band supported Duran Duran on a tour of the US, before embarking on their own headlining tour in February and March 1994.

"Sometimes (Lester Piggott)", "Say Something", and "Laid" were included on the band's first and fourth compilation albums, The Best Of (1998) and Fresh as a Daisy – The Singles (2007). "Out to Get You", "Five-O", and "Laid" were included on the band's third compilation album The Collection (2004). The music videos for "Sometimes (Lester Piggott)", "Say Something" (two versions), and "Laid" were included on the career-spanning box set The Gathering Sound (2012). Laid was reissued on CD in 2001, with the addition of live versions of "Laid", "Sometimes", and "Five-O", and a remix of "Say Something". Laid was re-pressed on vinyl in 1999, 2015, and 2020. It was released in 2015 in a deluxe box set (with Wah Wah) alongside numerous alternative takes, demos, and radio sessions. The same year, Laid was reissued on its own with a disc of highlights from the box set.

== Reception ==
Professional ratings
Review scores
Source	Rating
AllMusic	4.5/5 stars
The Audiophile Voice	B−
Calgary Herald	C+
Entertainment Weekly	A−
The Essential Rock Discography	7/10
NME	6/10
Q	4/5 stars
The San Diego Union-Tribune	3.5/4 stars
Select	4/5

Laid was met with generally favourable reviews from music critics. AllMusic reviewer Ned Raggett wrote that the album's quieter sound "turned out not merely to be a nice way to undercut expectations, but a creative benchmark for the group, arguably its artistic peak". Q writer Paul Davies called it as "striking, provocative and sharply melodic as its predecessor", aided by Eno's "lean, stripped down sound". Select's Andrew Harrison said the album's "real joy" is its "supernatural musical landscape," adding the band that were "hated when they knocked their corners off for the arenas is nowhere to be heard". Ian Gittins of Melody Maker said the album features "reflective, introspective musings with a heartening assurance, and mixes yearning and intelligence with a naked honesty which at times is genuinely stunning." He considered it a "remarkable rebirth" and said the band had "regained all the artistic ground they lost" with their previous album while managing to make "their strongest work" since their third studio album, Gold Mother (1990).

Entertainment Weekly writer Josef Woodard said the "[q]uirky numbers blend with dream interludes and droll carnality in this juicy alternative to the Alternative Parade." BBC Music reviewer Ian Wade wrote the album is full of "solid songwriting, showcasing James at their finest, relaxing into their own skins." The Washington Post's Mark Jenkins liked Eno's attempt to "recapture some of the delicacy of the band's initial work", offering up an album that is "not quite so bombastic as its immediate predecessors." The San Diego Union-Tribune contributor James Herbert noted while Booth's "acerbic observations and wounded-troubadour vocals wend through all 13 tracks", they are mainly "set to more brooding tunes that burble with atmosphere", and that Eno "indulge[d] in too much atmospheric dabbling." Johnny Dee of NME disliked Eno's production for "strip[ping] the songs of personality, and zip, inadvertently creating un-songs", and said these "sleep-inducing meanderings lull the listener into such a smoky kind of boredom." The Audiophile Voice's Mark Block expressed a similar sentiment: "I find the 'atmos' a little too smoky for my taste, but did it get in the way? No, but just barely". Calgary Herald writer Don McSwiney, meanwhile, praised Eno's work, as it made the band come across a "lot slicker, its rougher edges smoothed out and replaced with BIG production values likely with an eye to capitalizing on the modest success of its last effort".

Laid charted at number three in the UK, number 72 in the US, and number 86 in Australia. It was certified gold in the UK by the British Phonographic Industry and in the US by the Recording Industry Association of America. By 2001, Laid had sold 539,000 copies in the US. "Sometimes (Lester Piggott)" charted at number 18 in the UK and number 119 in Australia. "Laid" charted at number 25 in the UK and number 40 in Australia. In the US, "Laid" peaked at number three on the Billboard Alternative Airplay chart, at number 57 on the Radio Songs chart, and number 61 on the Hot 100. "Laid" was certified platinum by the BPI in 2021, and was included on lists of the decade's best songs compiled by PopMatters and uDiscoverMusic. Clash included "Out to Get You" and "Sometimes (Lester Piggott)" on their list of the top 10 best James songs.

=== Accolades ===
Accolades for Laid
Publication	List	Rank	Ref.
Les Inrockuptibles	Albums of the Year	28	
NME	20 Years On: Albums Of The Year 1993	28	
Select	Albums of the Year	26	

== Track listing ==
All songs written by Tim Booth, Larry Gott, and Jim Glennie. All recordings produced by Brian Eno.

1. "Out to Get You" – 4:26
2. "Sometimes (Lester Piggott)" – 5:10
3. "Dream Thrum" – 4:47
4. "One of the Three" – 4:08
5. "Say Something" – 3:26
6. "Five-O" – 5:25
7. "P.S." – 5:04
8. "Everybody Knows" – 3:28
9. "Knuckle Too Far" – 4:39
10. "Low Low Low" – 2:51
11. "Laid" – 2:36
12. "Lullaby" – 3:49
13. "Skindiving" – 5:41

== Personnel ==
Personnel per booklet.

James

- Tim Booth – vocals
- Larry Gott – guitar, additional vocals (track 1)
- Mark Hunter – keys
- Jim Glennie – bass
- Saul Davies – violin, guitar
- David Baynton-Power – drums

Additional musicians

- Brian Eno – additional bass, keyboards, additional vocals (tracks 2, 3 and 6)
- Martine McDonagh – additional vocals (tracks 2, 3 and 6)
- The Kitchenettes – additional vocals (track 10)

Production

- Brian Eno – producer
- Benedict Fenner – recording (all except track 7), mixing (all except tracks 8 and 10), additional recording (track 7)
- Markus Dravs – mixing (tracks 8 and 10)
- Steve 'Doc' Williams – recording (track 7)
- Mike Jones – assistant
- Ben 'Jude' Findlay – assistant engineer

Design

- Jane Gott – original art
- Nigel Schermuly – photography
- Kevin Westenberg – cover photography
- James – cover typography
- Stylorouge – design

== Charts ==
Weekly chart performance for Laid
Chart (1993–1994)	Peak position
Australian Albums (ARIA)	86
UK Albums (Official Charts)	3
US Billboard 200	72

== Certifications ==
Certifications for Laid
Region	Certification	Certified units/sales
United Kingdom (BPI)	Gold	100,000^{*}
United States (RIAA)	Gold	500,000^{^}
^{*} Sales figures based on certification alone.^{^} Shipments figures based on certification alone.
