= Wah Wah (album) =

Studio album by James
- Released: 29 August 1994
- Recorded: Early 1993
- Studio: Real World Studios, Box, Wiltshire
- Genre: Experimental rock; jam rock; art rock; alternative rock; electronic; ambient; dance; industrial dance; post-rock
- Length: 68:07
- Label: Fontana; Mercury
- Producer: Brian Eno; Markus Dravs

James chronology
Laid (1993)	Wah Wah (1994)	Whiplash (1997)

Singles from Wah Wah
- 1. "Say Something / Jam J" Released: 21 March 1994

Wah Wah (Note: The album title is rendered throughout the album packaging in upper case as WAH WAH.) is the sixth studio album by the Manchester-based English indie rock band James. (Note: Although the album is credited to James on the packaging, the UK version includes a sticker which credits the album to James/Eno.) After the success of their fourth album, Seven (1992), the band entered Real World Studios, Box, Wiltshire, to record their fifth album Laid in early 1993 with producer Brian Eno, with whom the group had longed to work. Prior to recording Laid, Eno observed the band's jam sessions at their Manchester rehearsal room, and considered these improvised pieces to be as important to the band's music as their eventually crafted songs. He requested to the group that whilst they were recording Laid, they would also concurrently record an album of their improvisations which Eno and, by Eno's request, second producer Markus Dravs would produce in a secondary studio in the Real World complex. Each composition started off with the band's improvisation being recorded, which Dravs would then edit, generally alone whilst James and Eno were recording Laid. Eno and Dravs would take a "promising" part of a recording and then mixed them only once. Tim Booth's desire to re-record some of his vocals caused friction in the studio.

Wah Wah consists of twenty-three tracks in total, and is often seen as the band's "experimental" and "jamming" companion to the "song"-centred Laid. Consequently it's their longest studio album to date with the band recording more than 300 songs for it. Ned Raggett said the album shares Laid's general focus towards an "evocative, restrained attractiveness and moody melancholy," but Wah Wah features more immediate numbers with full lyrics from Booth sung in his "fine voice", mixed with more open-ended instrumental or wordless vocal jams. The band intended to release Laid and Wah Wah at the same time, either as separate albums or as a double album, but hesitation from Fontana Records meant that Laid was released alone in October 1993 whilst Wah Wah was delayed until August 1994. In the intervening time, the only single from Wah Wah, "Jam J", was released in March 1994 as a double A-side with "Say Something" from Laid, reaching number 24 in the UK Singles Chart. When Wah Wah was eventually released, the band decided it would only be a limited edition available for one week, before only being available from mail order thereafter.

Critics were often divided in their reviews for Wah Wah, but were mostly positive. The Independent said that "a little bit of confusion is good for us all" whilst the NME called it "one of the few genuinely engaging dance albums around." Nonetheless, fans were more divided by the album, with the album's experimental bent meaning there was little to appeal to the more casual James fan. Retrospective assessment has been more positive, with Record Collector calling it a "landmark" album, whilst Allmusic noted that it was "one of the more uncommercial albums any band of its stature and its accompanying major label has had a hand in releasing." Select magazine named it the 45th best album of 1994 in their year-end critics poll. Wah Wah was remastered and re-released on clear heavyweight double vinyl in March 2015, alongside a remastered CD version in an expanded box set also containing a remastered edition of Laid.

== Background and conception ==
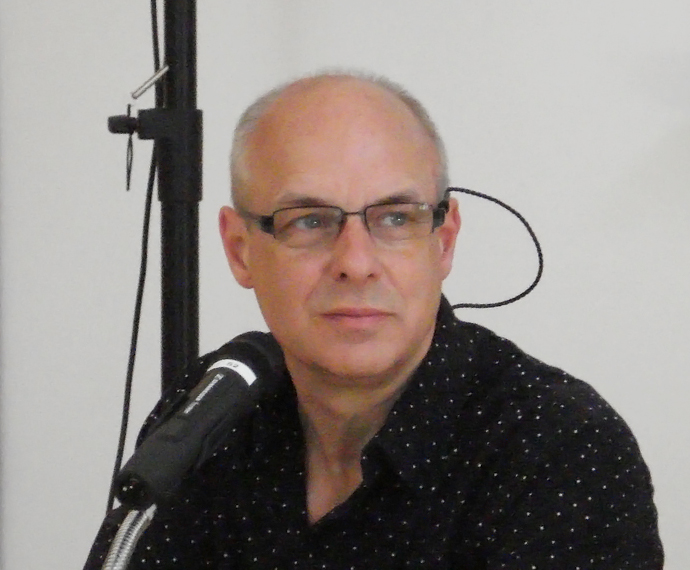
Producer Brian Eno requested that James record an album based solely on their studio improvisations.

James released their fourth studio album Seven in 1992 to critical and commercial acclaim. Lead single "Born of Frustration" became their biggest hit in the United States at the time, becoming a Top 5 hit on modern rock radio, and the band opened for Neil Young on the tour supporting his most recent album, Harvest Moon. The band spent the rest of the year touring before reconvening to begin work on their next album, Laid (1993). The band's tour with Young had proven influential on the album, especially because Young requested they play acoustically, something James had never done outside of radio sessions. The band's new stripped down approach for the album was helped by its producer Brian Eno. Working with Eno was a career long dream for the band, who had been trying to work with Eno since their first album, Stutter (1986); the band had sent demos of the song that would feature on Stutter to Eno's management but the band did not hear a reply, and they had consistently tried to work with him since. In the early stages of writing Laid, Booth addressed a person letter to Eno with a cassette of demos, and was surprised when Eno phoned him back, agreeing to produce the album.

Prior to the six-week recording sessions for Laid at Real World Studios, Box, Wiltshire, in early 1993, the band performed jam sessions at their Manchester rehearsal room in order to form songs. This was not unusual for the band; Booth commented in July 1994 that "every song [the band had] ever created was spawned from improvisation," adding that "we'd go in a room and make a racket." For the first few years of the band's career, "from three hours of cacophony would come maybe two minutes of semi-coherence," which would ultimately "be the seed of which [the band] would attempt to repeat and refine and eventually reveal to the public." By the recording sessions at Real World, the band had become "more efficient" in their "method of extraction." All twelve songs eventually released on Laid had evolved from this process.

Brian Eno observed the band's jam sessions during the rehearsals, calling them "extraordinary pieces of music appearing out of nowhere". He considered these pieces of "raw material" to be as much a part of the band's work as the songs that would have eventually grown out of them. Thus, he suggested to the band that in addition to recording Laid, he would also record and produce the band's jam sessions during the same sessions for a separate album, so that the band would be recording two albums concurrently: Laid, the album of "structured" songs, and Wah Wah, the album of improvisations. Speaking about the idea, Eno commented in July 1993:

"Improvisations are almost always the seeds for James' songs. Before we started our formal recording sessions for what became the Laid album, I spent some days working with the band in their rehearsal room in Manchester, seeing extraordinary pieces of music appearing out of nowhere. It occurred to me that this raw material was, in its own chaotic and perilous way, as much a part of their work as the songs that would finally grow out of it. The music was always on the edge of breakdown, held together by taut threads, semi-formed, evolving, full of beautiful, unrepeatable collisions and exotic collusions. I suggested that, instead of working on just one record (the 'song' record, for which we'd already agreed a very tight schedule) we find two studios next to each other and develop two albums concurrently - one of structured songs, and the other of these improvisations. It seemed pretty ambitious at the time, but we decided to aim for it."

== Recording ==
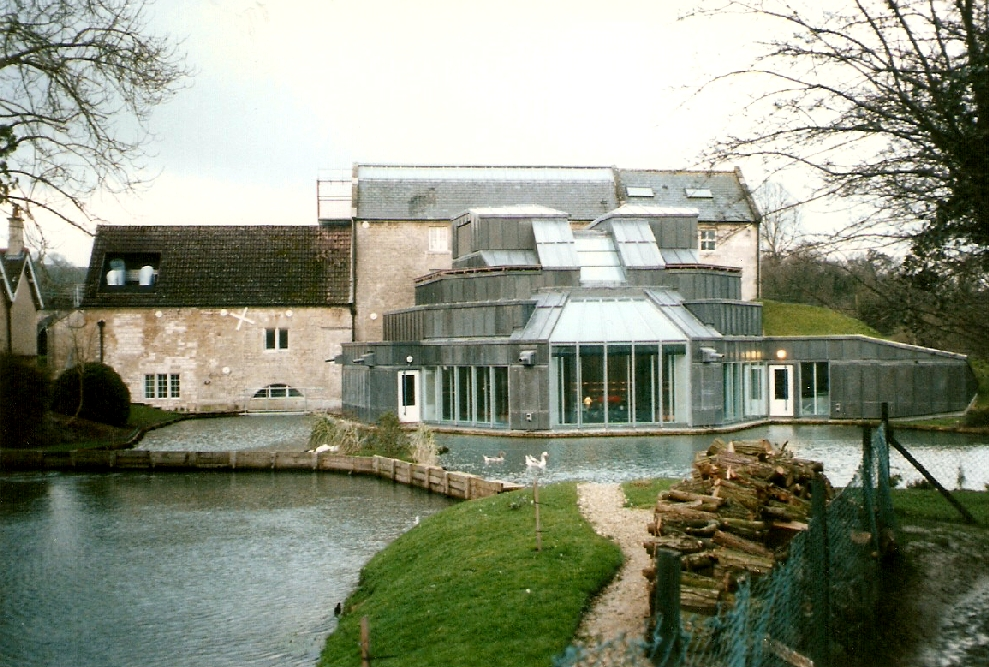
The album was recorded in a secondary studio at Real World Studios, Box, Wiltshire, whilst the band recorded Laid in another, larger studio at the complex.

For the recording of Wah Wah, Eno enlisted the help of engineer Markus Dravs to work as a co-producer, "providing distraction" to the band inside a secondary studio inside the Real World Studios complex from the recording of Laid, which was being recorded in one of the complex's larger studios. Eno recalled in June 1993 that he wanted Dravs "to look at the improvisations and see what he could make of them" while he [Eno] and James carried on recording Laid. Each improvisation started with the band recording a jam session improvisation, and then Eno or Dravs would then select a "promising" part of the improvised music and mix it, but with only one take on each mix to keep in the improvisation spirit. According to Annie Zaleski of The A.V. Club, each piece would be "whisked away" to Dravs "straightaway" for studio "tinkering" after the initial jamming process. Bassist Jim Glennie recalled that "it was a bit of a production line: We’d jam, those would go over to Markus to start properly messing about with. I think Brian was happy for us to be actively involved in that process, to try and keep it away from the main studio." Booth was then left to come up with lyrics, but many of the tracks ultimately remained instrumentals or had soundbites rather than coherent structured lyrics.

"I wanted [Dravs] to look at the improvisations and see what he could make of them while we carried on with the 'song' record. We'd select a promising section from an improvisation and he'd investigate it. Using bits of processing equipment and treatment techniques evolved in my studio, he'd evolve new sound-landscapes located at the outer edges of aural culture. We were initially too busy in the other studio to bother him much, which left him free to work with the material in much the same spirit as it was originally performed - by improvising at the console."

— Brian Eno recalling his instructions for Dravs.

Generally, the band improvised late at night and in very dim light, working on "huge" reels of tape, so that they, Eno and Dravs could play for over an hour without needing to change reels. According to Eno, "strange new worlds took shape out of bewildering deserts of confusion, consolidated, lived gloriously for a few minutes and then crumbled away." They never tried making anything twice: "once it had gone, we went somewhere else." Ben Fenner, who was engineering the sessions, "attentively and unobtrusively coped" with unpredictable instrument and level changes in near-total darkness, leaving the band and the producers to "wander around our new landscapes." Dravs generally worked on the material alone, improvising at the studio console, as James and Eno were busy recording Laid, but as Laid neared completion, the band and Eno spent more time in the "wild" studio where Wah Wah was being edited, where they worked long days, but there was "always enough going on to prevent any loss of momentum," and "things happened very quickly." Eno completed his mixes for the jams in a single afternoon, where he spent time trying to "get a little of each jam onto DAT because there was so much new work flying around that it was hard to remember it all." He had made 55 mixes that day and never mixed anything twice, not expecting to use these mixes for the final album, but he decided that this fast, impulsive way of working was "right in the spirit of the performances," and that the results, as he described them, "often make a cinematic, impressionistic counterpoint to the elaborate post-industrial drama of Markus' mixes." He commented that "they set each other off well: the combination feels like being at the edge of somewhere - where industry merges with landscape, metal with space, corrupted machinery with unsettled weather patterns, data-noise with insect chatter."

Three of the songs were written outside of the sessions, two prior to the sessions and one afterwards, although these songs are generally accepted to also be improvisations. "Pressure's On" in fact dated back to 1991, whilst "Maria", albeit in more conventional form, had been commonly played live by James since 1992, but failed to make the cut for Laid. However, "Tomorrow" was said to have been conceived at the BBC's Maida Vale Studios on the day Laid was released, when the band had some free time between playing a song into each show that day on BBC Radio 1. Ultimately, the recording sessions were not smooth; the band later told Stuart Maconie in 2000 for their authorised biography Folklore that the album caused disagreements, particularly over Booth's wish to re-record some of his vocals and over how to deal with the finished record. Booth remembers jamming "hundreds of songs that never saw the light of day" and guitarist Larry Gott suggests it might have been "as many as 340 tracks" recorded.

== Musical style and composition ==
Compared with Laid, which was referred to as the "song" album of the pair, Wah Wah was known as the "experimental" or "jamming" album, and contains 23 highly experimental tracks. Ned Raggett of Allmusic said that "definitely compared to the beautifully structured and precisely produced Laid, Wah Wah is much more a series of explorations in sound." The album shares Laid's general focus towards an "evocative, restrained attractiveness and moody melancholy," but Wah Wah features more immediate numbers with full lyrics from Booth sung in his "fine voice" mixed with more open-ended instrumental or wordless vocal jams. Some songs are by default much more fragmentary than others, lyrics "just dreamed up of the top of Booth's head," the rest of the band working around a rhythm loop or quietly rolling rhythm. Almost Cool said that "amid the backwash of soundscapes, it's still James, and no matter how much sounds there are, Tim Booths vocals are still present, whether it's as a nearly unrecognizable cut-up wash of sound, or straight-up on fairly normal-sounding (for the group) tracks." The Harvard Crimson described Wah Wah as the "dark side" of Laid, and commented that "the 23 tracks reflect two general moods: one, a dreamy, new-age rain-foresty wash of sound over which an cerie voice intones barely audible lyrics; the other, an abrasive, Achtung Baby industrial-esque sound with distorted, staticky vocals," whilst The A.V. Club said Wah Wah was "a diverse, patchwork-sounding record that touched on abstract electronic experiments and noisy rock tangles."

Although James are an alternative rock and indie rock band, and Wah Wah is characterized as an experimental rock album, the album is sometimes seen as an electronic dance and ambient album. Joseph Gallivan of The Independent described it as "mainly electronic, and features lead singer Tim Booth experimenting with freely associative lyrics in a falsetto voice." Emma Forrest of the NME took the album to be more of a textural record, saying "it's an ambient album, with something to hook onto - moving wallpaper in the nicest possible sense. It's one of the few genuinely engaging dance albums around." Besides the NME, Almost Cool, Entertainment Weekly and Q also considered it an ambient album, but the latter also noted that "like all such jams, [the album shows] the band perm grooves, riffs, chants, licks and lyrical snatches in various stages of dress but still too naked to leave the house." They also considered the album to contain Eno's industrial dance sound. The Sheffield Electronic Press characterized the album as featuring an "experimental dance dynamic," whilst another journalist of NME later said the album contained "techno experiments". Tim Peacock of Record Collector considered the jams to be "Can-style."

The album has been sometimes compared to U2's recently released eighth album Zooropa (1993), which was also co-produced by Brian Eno. Emma Forrest of the NME said that Wah Wah was "in the same vein as U2's Zooropa - but less contrived," and Almost Cool compared "Frequency Dip" to Zooropa, The Harvard Crimson said the album's alternative "murky, cold [and] abrasive" style "has the same exhilarating-yet-numbing power of much of U2's latest albums" and said "Jam J" "seems lifted right from Zooropa, with driving rhythms, snarly lyrics obscured by feedback, and angry bursts of guitars breaking through the mess." whilst Melody Maker would later say that the sessions saw the band "do a U2" by "get that Brian Eno in for a bit" and "experimenting with dance music". The NME also later said that "by the time [Wah Wah] was released, U2 and Eno had steamed through with the like-sounding Zooropa, which made James seem silly and after the fact." However, although Wah Wah was released after Zooropa, it was largely recorded first, with Zooropa becoming Eno's first major project after Laid and Wah Wah when that album was largely recorded in spring 1993. Booth said that "everyone thought we were copying off them instead of the other way round!" Even the Stars commented that Wah Wah "often gets mistakenly tied in as some form of apeing U2's "improvised" Zooropa album - mistaken on two fronts - firstly Wah Wah was recorded first and secondly, and more importantly, this is a much rawer form of the art, most of it taken as it was recorded and not fully formed into songs, something Zooropa clearly isn't."

=== Songs ===
Raggett described "Pressure's On" as a cousin to Laid's opening song "Out to Get You" that could have "easily fit" on that album. It features a "weirdly hypnotic synthesizer, the surreal, breathy vocals and the only occasionally comprehensible lyrics [combining] to create a liquid, seductive, trippy sound." "Jam J" was compared to U2's Zooropa by Joyelle H. McSweeney of The Harvard Crimson, who noted the song contains "driving rhythms, snarly lyrics obscured by feedback, and angry bursts of guitars breaking through the mess." "Frequency Dip" is said by one reviewer to recall U2's Zooropa and "moves along with a throbbing bass loop and is thick on the drums. The vocals jump around in the song so much, it is as if someone is going crazy with the crossfader." "Burn the Cat" is a slow, minimalistic song with only minute guitar chords, drum beats and various snippets of vocals drifting in and out of the song. "Tomorrow" features a "rather attackling" drum line and interwinding guitar strum and vocals. "Gospel Oak," relies heavily on harpsichord-like synthesiser, with disorienting results.

"Say Say Something", which shows a heavy Indian influence, features an ironic title as the track "doesn't even vaguely resemble the song with almost the same title from Laid," "Say Something." The song contains no vocals but "conveys a lot of feeling", as a "lonely" guitar drones throughout the track while various other sounds fade in and out. Raggett said it "shares title and inspiration with the similarly named Laid song but takes a much different direction, with what sounds like Indian violin contributing to a slow-paced, serene wash of sound." "Honest Joe" is a "solid, techno-tinged trip". "Rhythmic Dreams" relies on a steady jungly drumbeat and mantra-like vocals to give the piece shape. "Laughter" features no lyrics and, as the title suggests, it features laughter throughout.

== Release and promotion ==
The band initially planned to release Wah Wah simultaneously with Laid, or perhaps to release them together as a double album or to release Wah Wah as a free giveaway with Laid, but these plans were shelved when the band's record label, Fontana Records, were initially reluctant to release Wah Wah. Glennie recalled "we bumped into problems with the record company’s ability to deal with [releasing both albums at once]. I think they thought it would confuse people, which is a shame, really. I wish now in reflection we had just kind of pushed them regardless and done it." Laid itself was released alone by the label on 5 October 1993. It was the band's biggest success to date, receiving some of the band's best reviews, and it was also their first album to chart in the United States and ultimately their most successful there, peaking at number 72 on the Billboard 200 chart and later being certified Gold by the RIAA for selling 600,000 copies there. It success was largely due to the lead single, "Laid", which became a crossover hit in the United States.

Nonetheless, the band continued to see Laid and Wah Wah as a complementary pair, but struggled to decide on how to release Wah Wah. "Jam J" was released as double A-side single with "Say Something" from Laid in March 1994, becoming the first song to be released from Wah Wah. It reached number 24 in the UK Singles Chart, although it was "Say Something" that received the most airplay of the two songs. Eventually they decided to release Wah Wah as a limited edition that would be deleted after one week of sale in September 1994. Ultimately, this plan came to fruition except with a slight modification in release date, and Wah Wah was ultimately released by itself on 29 August 1994 by Fontana Records in the UK and Mercury Records in the US. After one week of retail, Wah Wah was then only made available thereafter by mail order. The album was released in a card sleeve in the UK but a jewel case in the US. The US version features the band's name on the album cover, designed by Stylorogue, whereas the UK version doesn't but instead features the artist credit of "James/Eno" as a sticker on the sleeve. The album was originally going to be titled Frequency Dip after the fourth song on the album, but the name was changed to Wah Wah because "it was more rock 'n' roll."

Besides the already released "Jam J", the band decided to release no singles to promote the album, nor would they undertake a promotional tour, and ultimately very little promotion was given to the album, besides some press attention. Despite the lack of traditional promotion, the album debuted and peaked at number 11 on the UK Albums Chart, but soon disappeared from the charts. However, in the United States, the album was not a commercial success as Laid was, and effectively shrunk the band's American audience, from which it did not escalate again. Booth recalled that it "put paid to us breaking America at all!" "Pressure's On", "Basic Brian", "Jam J", "Honest Joe" and "Tomorrow" featured regularly in James live sets.

== Critical reception ==
Professional ratings
Initial reviews (in 1994)
Review scores
Source	Rating
Entertainment Weekly	(B+)
The Independent	(favourable)
Melody Maker	(favourable)
Music Week	4/5 stars
NME	(7/10)
Q	2/5 stars
Rolling Stone	(favourable)
Select	3/5 medals

Professional ratings
Retrospective reviews (after 1994)
Review scores
Source	Rating
AllMusic	3.5/5 stars
Almost Cool	(7.25/10)
Martin C. Strong	(6/10)

The album was released to mixed to positive reviews from music critics, although the low profile of the release saw it ignored in certain quarters. One biographer later noted "some reviewers missed the concept of the album and were puzzled as to why James were releasing it at all." Reviewing the album before release in mid-July 1994, Joseph Gallivan of The Independent was favourable, saying "a little bit of confusion is good for us all." Emma Forrest of the NME rated the album seven out of ten, saying "it's an ambient album, with something to hook onto - moving wallpaper in the nicest possible sense. It's one of the few genuinely engaging dance albums around." Less favourable in the British press were Q, with Mat Snow giving the album two stars out of five and saying "though no more than four tracks (especially Tomorrow and Jam J) out of a whopping 23 are anything like individually satisfactory, each is pregnant with a certain possibility, suggesting fully-fledged James tunes to come. Meanwhile, buffed up with Brian Eno's signature opiated industrial dance sound and accumulating in mood over an hour, they total an intriguingly unfocused ambient experience." Besides critics, one biographer noted "there was little to appeal to the more casual James fan in the rest of the album. For the more committed, it provided a previously unseen insight into the band's working methods." Select ranked the album at number 45 in their list of the top 50 albums of 1994.

In the United States, where the band had found success with Laid, reviews for Wah Wah were more favourable, despite the commercial failure of the album in the country. Dimitri Ehrlich of Entertainment Weekly graded the album "B+", saying the album shows "James at its most inspired and unpredictable" and called the album "a joyride of a record." The Harvard Crimson said "Wah Wah is not ear candy, like much of Laid; it's meant to get inside your head, and that may be a bit more than you're in the market for when you slap down your money at HMV." Rolling Stone were also favourable to the album.

Retrospective reviews were more positive. Alongside Laid, Record Collector called Wah Wah a "landmark" album that remains "loose" and "intuitive", rating it and Laid four stars out of five. The two albums have also been referred to as "groundbreaking". Ned Raggett of AllMusic rated the album three and a half stars out of five, saying that Wah Wah is the result of "one of the more uncommercial albums any band of its stature and its accompanying major label has had a hand in releasing." He concluded that, "overall, Wah Wah makes for a good listen both as a companion piece to Laid and on its own understated merits." In a review for a subsequent album, Pitchfork Media called it a "really great album," whilst Misfit City called it "marvellous and underrated." Almost Cool rated the album 7.25 out of ten and said that, "overall, the album displays as much variety as could possibly be expected from James. The influences of Brian Eno are also very much detectable, as a lot of the songs have the sort of ambience that he was an early influence and pioneer of. It is one of those rare albums that is wonderful just to sit back and listen to. Most of the 23 songs are mixed together and the CD flows beautifully through its almost 70 minutes of music. Even non-fans of James will probably find themselves surprised by the product." Martin C. Strong rated the album six out of ten in his book The Essential Rock Discography.

== Aftermath and legacy ==
Guitarist Larry Gott left the band after the release of the album, and the band took an extended break throughout 1995. For their subsequent album Whiplash (1997), James worked with Stephen Hague with Eno only providing "additional assistance", although his influence was noted on the album. On Whiplash, the band worked towards a more song-centric sound again, although its half-experimental and half familiar approach was compared to Wah Wah. The album features a more anthemetic re-recording of "Tomorrow" (which had appeared on Wah Wah), which was released as the album's second single, reaching number 12 in the UK Singles Chart. For that album's follow-up, Millionaires (1999), the band regrouped with Eno as official producer for the first time since the Laid and Wah Wah sessions. Tim Booth later stated that Laid and Wah Wah are "the culmination of playing four or five hours a day four or five days a week in Manchester and the new band adapting to that. It is about the transition of becoming more of a band but with Brian at the helm."

The A.V. Club reflected that the success of Laid "in the pop realm meant that when Wah Wah eventually did come out in 1994, it felt like a bizarre detour and attempt at career sabotage rather than a bookend to a wonderful recording experience." Even the Stars commented that "the James faithful are split down the middle on Wah Wah. Those with a predilection for the big hit singles turn their nose up at it, but those who dig a little deeper know that it is the real James baring their artistic soul, opening up their creative process to outside scrutiny - raw, real and putting everything out on the line. It's a fascinating insight into the workings of the band egged on by one of the most inventive writers and producers of the generation - a completely unique record and typical of James' contrary approach at times."

On 23 March 2015, Wah Wah was remastered and re-released by Universal Music as a clear, heavyweight (180 g) double LP, featuring a printed inner sleeve and download code, and as part of the CD box set Laid & Wah Wah, featuring CD copies of the two albums (released together for the first time as was originally intended) alongside numerous bonus discs of rarities and unreleased bonus material. Stephen Thomas Erlewine, in a four stars out of five review for the box set for Allmusic, referred to Wah Wah as "elastic". Tim Peacock, also rating the box set four stars out of five in a review for Record Collector, commented that Wah Wah contains "lesser-vaunted treasures."

=== Accolades ===
Publication	Country	Accolade	Year	Rank
Select	UK	Albums of the Year	1994	45

== Track listing ==
All songs written and performed by James and Brian Eno.

1. "Hammer Strings" –2:15
2. "Pressure's On" – 4:25
3. "Jam J" – 3:36
4. "Frequency Dip" – 3:33
5. "Lay the Law Down" – 0:57
6. "Burn the Cat" – 6:50
7. "Maria" – 4:17
8. "Low Clouds (1)" – 0:18
9. "Building a Fire" – 2:45
10. "Gospel Oak" – 2:49
11. "DVV" – 1:04
12. "Say Say Something" – 5:41
13. "Rhythmic Dreams" – 2:36
14. "Dead Man" – 0:56
15. "Rain Whistling" – 2:46
16. "Basic Brian" – 5:41
17. "Low Clouds (2)" – 0:04
18. "Bottom of the Well" – 3:16
19. "Honest Joe" – 4:39
20. "Arabic Agony" – 3:57
21. "Tomorrow" – 2:29
22. "Laughter" – 0:31
23. "Sayonara" – 2:41

== Charts ==
=== Album ===
Chart (1994)	Peak position
UK Albums Chart	11

=== Singles ===
Single	Chart (1994)	Peak position
"Jam J"	UK Singles Chart	24
