= One Man Clapping =

Live album by James
- Released: March 1989
- Recorded: November 1988
- Venue: Bath Moles Club
- Length: 35:32
- Label: One Man/Rough Trade
- Producer: Steve Power

James chronology
Strip-mine (1988)	One Man Clapping (1989)	Gold Mother (1990)

Professional ratings
Review scores
Source	Rating
AllMusic	2.5/5 stars
Q	3/5 stars

One Man Clapping is the third album from English band James, a live album released in March 1989. The album was recorded at the Moles Club, Bath, Somerset on the 14 and 15 November 1988. The album was issued on their own One Man imprint of Rough Trade Records, after parting company with Blanco y Negro/Sire. To fund the album, the band had to borrow £12,000 from the Royal Bank of Scotland. Initially, the bank manager was not willing to lend the band the money, but after seeing them live in Manchester he agreed.

Because the album was self-funded, only 10,000 CD copies were produced; this has made the album highly sought after by collectors. Copies have been known to trade hands on eBay for in excess of £100.

== Track listing ==
1. "Chain Mail" – 3:26
2. "Sandman (Hup-Springs)" – 3:43
3. "Whoops" – 3:26
4. "Riders" – 3:35
5. "Leaking" – 4:09
6. "Why So Close" – 4:10
7. "Ya Ho" – 4:45 (not on vinyl version of album)
8. "Johnny Yen" – 3:43
9. "Scarecrow" – 2:49
10. "Are You Ready" – 2:59
11. "Really Hard" – 4:23
12. "Burned" – 4:29
13. "Stutter" – 5:33

== Release details ==
- UK 12" Vinyl – One Man/Rough Trade Records (ONE MAN 1 LP)
- UK Cassette – One Man/Rough Trade Records (ONE MAN 1 C)
- UK CD – One Man/Rough Trade Records (ONE MAN 1 CD)

This album was pressed onto cd by MPO France.

== Personnel ==
=== James ===
- Tim Booth - Vocals & Words
- Larry Gott - Guitar & Vocals
- Jim Glennie - Bass & Vocals
- Gavan Whelan - Drums

=== Additional musicians ===
- Mick Armistead – keyboards
