= I Know What I'm Here For =

1999 single by James

Single by James

from the album Millionaires
- B-side: "All Good Boys"; "Imagine Ourselves"; "Downstairs"; "Stolen Horse"
- Released: 19 July 1999
- Length: 3:56
- Label: Mercury
- Songwriters: David Baynton-Power; Jim Glennie; Mark Hunter; Saul Davies; Tim Booth
- Producer: Brian Eno

James singles chronology
"Sit Down '98" (1998)	"I Know What I'm Here For" (1999)	"Just Like Fred Astaire" (1999)

Music video
- "I Know What I'm Here For" on YouTube

"I Know What I'm Here For" is a song by British rock band James. It was the first single released from their eighth studio album, Millionaires, and reached number 22 on the UK Singles Chart.

== Background, release and reception ==
It's about the meaning of life. It's also about the nature of being in a band: the fulfilment of adolescent fantasies of endless drugs, drink and sex. But unless there's self-discipline, it can easily become a nightmare ... Initially we did it almost as a blues song, but [producer] Brian Eno came up with the wacky, space-funk hookline. It became the album's first single, to make an announcement that we'e gone into a new musical area.

— Tim Booth, singer

The single was released on CD and cassette and reached number 22 in the UK Top 40 chart, spending five weeks on the chart.

A live version and a video appeared on the limited edition two-disc edition of Millionaires.

The backing to the song was used by Ford in adverts shown during broadcasts of the UEFA Champions League in the 2007/2008 football season.

Peter Buckley, in The Rough Guide to Rock, described it as an "effortless soaring track". In contrast, Victoria Segal, reviewing the track for the NME, described it as "not interesting ... just silly".

== Track listings ==
UK CD1

1. "I Know What I'm Here For"
2. "All Good Boys"
3. "Imagine Ourselves"

UK CD2

1. "I Know What I'm Here For"
2. "Downstairs"
3. "Stolen Horse"

UK cassette single

1. "I Know What I'm Here For"
2. "All Good Boys"

European maxi-CD single

1. "I Know What I'm Here For"
2. "All Good Boys"
3. "Imagine Ourselves"
4. "Downstairs"

== Charts ==
Chart (1999)	Peak position
Europe (Eurochart Hot 100)	69
Scottish Singles Sales (Official Charts)	14
UK Singles (Official Charts)	22
