= Seven (James album) =

Studio album by James
- Released: 17 February 1992
- Recorded: January – September 1991
- Studios: The Manor, Oxfordshire; Olympic, Barnes, London
- Genre: Stadium rock
- Length: 48:55
- Label: Fontana
- Producers: Martin "Youth" Glover; James; Steve Chase

James chronology
Gold Mother (1990)	Seven (1992)	Laid (1993)

Singles from Seven
- 1. "Sound" Released: 18 November 1991; 2. "Born of Frustration" Released: 20 January 1992; 3. "Ring the Bells" Released: 23 March 1992; 4. "Seven" Released: 6 July 1992

Seven is the fourth studio album by English rock band James. It was released on 17 February 1992, through Fontana Records. After writing new material in their practice space, the band began recording at The Manor Studios. The sessions lasted for several months, with the band producing the proceedings themselves. After a lack of progress, Fontana halted the sessions, and sent them to work at Olympic Studios with Martin "Youth" Glover. Half of the songs were produced by Youth, while the remainder was produced between James and Steve Chase. Described as a stadium rock album, Seven drew comparison to the likes of Simple Minds and U2.

Preceded by a three-month tour of the United Kingdom, "Sound" was released as the lead single in November 1991, which was then followed the second single "Born of Frustration" in January 1992. To promote the album, the band embarked on a tour of the United States, which coincided with the release of the third single "Ring the Bells" in March 1992. James played their sole UK headlining show at the Alton Towers leisure park in July 1992 to a crowd of 30,000. Two days after the show, "Seven" was released as the fourth and final single. Following this, the band toured Europe and supported Neil Young on his west coast US tour, which was succeeded by a support slot for the Soup Dragons.

Seven received mixed reviews from music critics, some of whom noted the album's bigger sound. It peaked at number two in the UK and number 45 in Sweden. "Sound", "Born of Frustration", "Ring the Bells", and "Seven" all charted in the UK, the first three reaching the top 40. Outside the UK, "Sound" reached the top 40 in Australia, Ireland, and Portugal, while "Born of Frustration" appeared on the US Billboard Alternative Airplay chart, and in the Netherlands. Seven was later certified gold in the UK.

== Background and production ==
James released their third studio album Gold Mother in June 1990, through Fontana Records. The album saw the band's line-up expanded to include three new members: drummer David Baynton-Power, violinist/guitarist Saul Davies, keyboardist Mark Hunter, and trumpeter Andy Diagram. Following touring in support of the album, the band began accumulating new material at their practice space in Denton. At the suggestion of Fontana, the band decamped to The Manor Studios in Oxfordshire to start recording their next album in January 1991. They wanted to work with Gil Norton, however, he was busy working with the Pixies; they then attempted to draft in Flood, who instead worked with U2. In hindsight, guitarist Larry Gott said the band lacked the confidence that a producer had, causing them to over-fill the songs with instruments.

Though they had planned to stay in the studio for six weeks, the sessions stretched out to multiple months. They had to pause recording to promote "Sit Down", which had been released as a single in March 1991. The success of the song hampered the progress of their new album, and put a strain on the band, as they had to deal with reporters and press interviews. The band's first video album Come Home Live was released in April 1991, and featured live recordings of new tracks "Ring the Bells", "Bring a Gun", and "Next Lover". That same month, the band reportedly had 40 new songs to choose for their next album. As the label was anxious at how the band's album was proceeded, and wanted new product to sell, they decided to reissue Gold Mother. Powered by a few minor hit singles, Gold Mother was a commercial success upon its re-release in May 1991, when it reached number two in the UK Albums Chart.

In August 1991, the band appeared at Reading Festival, where they live a set of mainly new songs, and was met with negative reviews from the music press. Fontana halted any further sessions, and re-located the band to London where they recorded with former Killing Joke member Martin "Youth" Glover at Olympic Studios in Barnes, London. According to Booth, Youth pushed the band to record the album as live as possible with minimal overdubs; Spike Stent handling recording. The final songs that ended up on Seven split producer credit between two camps: Youth for "Born of Frustration", "Sound", "Bring a Gun", "Don't Wait That Long", "Next Lover", and "Seven"; and James and Steve Chase for "Ring the Bells", "Mother", "Live a Love of Life", "Heavens", and "Protect Me". Sessions wrapped up in September 1991, as Tim Palmer mixed all of the recordings at Townhouse Studios except "Don't Wait That Long", which was mixed by Stent at Olympic.

== Composition ==
Musically, the sound of Seven has been described as stadium rock, drawing comparison to U2. While two reviewers compared the whole album to Simple Minds, others limited it to "Born of Frustration" or "Seven" only. Booth said Seven referred to several things: the seven band members; "Sit Down" entering the charts at number seven; being given the number seven dressing room while appearing on Top of the Pops. The album features more of emphasis on Diagram's trumpet playing; he had told the band he wanted to have more input into the writing process or he wasn't going to be involved at all. "Born of Frustration" discusses having multiple possibilities in front of one's self and not being able to have any of them. Booth said "Ring the Bells" referred to "breaking free from [p]atriarchal Jehovah," while "finger pointing [the] God of shame." "Sound" features an electronic section that was reminiscent to the music heard in John Carpenter films. "Bring a Gun" was written after a shooting at a club in Manchester, and, according to Booth, detailed the repressive attitude that authority figures have towards younger generations. Some of the lyrics deal with people having a lack of compassion for others, and the need for political violence.

The anti-war track "Mother" earned a comparison to Nick Cave and the Bad Seeds due to its reverb-enhanced guitars and atmospheric violin. Its title referred to Gold Mother, Saddam Hussein's speech about the "Mother of all battles", and childless mothers as a result of war. "Don't Wait That Long" displays the folk elements of the band's earlier albums. It initially had a faster tempo, before it was eventually slowed down and utilized elements of soul music. "Next Lover", which also shares the folk elements, talks about desire. Booth saw "Live a Love of Life" as a partial continuation of the Gold Mother track "God Only Knows", in that he talked about rejected his Christian upbringing; it includes references to the Gulf War. The verses of "Heavens" talk about a person with their head in their hands thinking about self-pity and despondency. "Protect Me" is about praying for protection, and dates back to when Booth broke up with his girlfriend and the band's manager Martine McDonagh. Booth said "Seven" was one of the few love songs he had written; it includes references to "various ecstatic experiences of union - in meditation and sex."

== Release ==
Between September and November 1991, the band embarked on a large-scale UK tour, with support from Thousand Yard Stare. "Sound" was released as the album's lead single on 18 November 1991, with "All My Songs", and a remix of "Come Home" as extra tracks; the music video for "Sound" was directed by Peter Scammell. In December 1991, the band flew to Los Angeles, California to shoot a music video for "Born of Frustration", however, three hours after arriving, Gott was mugged at gunpoint and flew back to the UK. As a result, the band's tour manager stood in for Gott at the video shoot, which was also directed by Scammell. That same month, Seven was announced for release early next year. The final video featured footage of windstorms in deserts, angel sculptures, and skyscrapers. "Born of Frustration" was released as a single on 20 January 1992, with "Be My Prayer", and a remix of "Sound" as extra tracks. Seven was released on 17 February 1992; its vinyl release omitted "Next Lover". Following this, the band embarked on a 13-date US tour.

"Ring the Bells" was released as a single on 23 March 1992, with "Fight", "Once a Friend", and remixes of "Come Home"; the music video for "Ring the Bells" was directed by Scammell. In June 1992, the band performed at the Glastonbury Festival. James played their only UK headlining show of the year at an open-air concert at the Alton Towers leisure park on 4 July 1992, where they performed to a crowd of 30,000, with support from Public Image Ltd. Galliano was also due to support but had to pull out after weather conditions threatened to destroy the stage's roof. Two days later, "Seven" was released as a single, with "Goalies Ball", "William Burroughs", and "Still Alive" as extra tracks. Following this, the band played various festivals across Europe. Diagram left the band, citing that he wanted to explore other opportunities, and missed his girlfriend. In September 1992, they returned to the US where they supported Neil Young on nine of his west coast show. During these dates, James played acoustically. After this, they toured the territory supporting the Soup Dragons for six weeks, before going on a tour of Japan in December 1991. Later in December, the band went on a stint of the UK, which was promoted as an acoustic tour.

A show in December 1991 was filmed and released in 1992 as the band's second video album Seven – The Live Video, where the band played every song from the album. Its 2005 DVD re-release saw the inclusion of videos for "Born of Frustration", "Sound", "Seven", "Come Home" and "Sit Down". A show in November 1992 was released as the live album The Greenpeace Palace Concert as part of the 2016 Record Store Day. "Born of Frustration", "Ring the Bells", "Sound", and "Seven" were included on the band's first and fourth compilation albums The Best Of (1998) and Fresh as a Daisy – The Singles (2007). "Heavens" and "Seven" were included on the band's third compilation album The Collection (2004). The music videos for "Born of Frustration", "Ring the Bells", "Sound", and "Seven" were included on the career-spanning box set The Gathering Sound (2012), alongside a demo of "Ring the Bells". Seven was reissued on CD in 2001, with the addition of live versions of "Protect Me", "Sound", "Heavens", and "Don't Wait That Long". Seven was re-pressed on vinyl in 2017, with "Next Lover" reinstated. To celebrate the 30th anniversary of their Alton Towers show, the band played Castlefield Bowl in Castlefield in 2022, where they repeated the same setlist.

== Reception ==
Professional ratings
Review scores
Source	Rating
AllMusic	4/5 stars
Calgary Herald	C+
Chicago Tribune	(mixed)
Martin C. Strong	8/10
NME	5/10
Q	3/5 stars
Select	3/5 stars
Vox	8/10

Seven was met with mixed reviews from music critics. Vox's Mike Pattenden referred to Seven as "a substantial document that marks James out as one of the few bands around who are capable of framing the anxiety and apprehension of eternal adolescence." AllMusic reviewer Tom Demalon noted that the album "married the ambitious scope of the lyrics with a grand, anthemic feel." He said the album "might not be completely embraced by older fans, but it's a confident, artistic step and a fine entry in their catalog." Phil Sutcliffe of Q wrote that "James were part of something, but now they've become one-offs. ... In part, they have overarched their ability to put sounds and tunes to their teeming ideas, but at least if you want a band with balls, they got 'em." The staff at Melody Maker called the album "big, brash, unafraid, unashamed but also miserable, paranoid, eccentric and epically confused," showcasing the band at musically their "most ambitious and diverse." They went on further to say that Seven was "an indisputable triumph from a band who spent the best part of a decade being shit."

The staff at Chicago Tribune said the despite the band managing to evade the "neopsychedelic '60s revival and the more pervasive electronic pop of New Order," it was "somewhat disappointing that it should pull off a soulless imitation of U2" on Seven. They added that fans of U2 "will find comfort in ... Booth's rendering of Bono's wailing" in certain songs. Neil Dunlop of Calgary Herald considered the band to be "chronically under the influence [of Simple Minds and U2]. What's the point if you can buy the original?" In a review for Select, David Cavanagh wrote that the band created "a solid, undemanding stadium album," adding that it had "a classic hermetically-sealed sound, big, wide and virtually soulless." NME reviewer Andrew Collins wrote that all of the songs were "fit for widescreen promo treatment," with melodies that come across as "incidental to broad, sweeping effect." He noted that while the "individual interesting-noise-count is consistently high, tunes are tragically thin on the ground." In 2011, Seven was ranked at number 238 in Q's readers poll of the "250 Best Albums of the Last 25 Years".

According to Fontana Records' owner Phonogram, Seven sold 100,000 copies in advance orders prior to release. It peaked at number two in the UK, and number 45 in Sweden. Seven was later certified gold in the UK. "Sound" charted at number 4 in Portugal, number 9 in the UK, number 15 in Ireland, and number 28 in Australia. "Born of Frustration" charted at number 5 on the US Billboard Alternative Airplay chart, number 13 in the UK, number 69 in the Netherlands. "Rings the Bells" and "Seven" charted in the UK at number 37 and 46, respectively.

== Track listing ==
All songs written by James.

Seven track listing
No.	Title	Producer	Length
1.	"Born of Frustration"	Martin "Youth" Glover	4:21
2.	"Ring the Bells"	James; Steve Chase	4:45
3.	"Sound"	Youth	6:40
4.	"Bring a Gun"	Youth	3:42
5.	"Mother"	James; Chase	2:40
6.	"Don't Wait That Long"	Youth	6:39
7.	"Live a Love of Life"	James; Chase	4:18
8.	"Next Lover" (not on original vinyl version)	Youth	5:27
9.	"Heavens"	James; Chase	3:56
10.	"Protect Me"	James; Chase	3:05
11.	"Seven"	Youth	3:22

== Personnel ==
Personnel per booklet.

James

- Tim Booth – vocals
- Andy Diagram – trumpet, backing vocals
- Dave Baynton-Power – drums, percussion
- Jim Glennie – bass guitar
- Saul Davies – guitars, violin, backing vocals, percussion
- Mark Hunter – keyboards
- Larry Gott – guitar

Additional musicians

- Durga McBroom — backing vocals (track 6)

Production and design

- Martin "Youth" Glover – producer (tracks 1, 3, 4, 6, 8 and 11)
- Spike Stent – recording (tracks 1, 3, 4, 6, 8 and 11), mixing (track 6)
- James – producer (tracks 2, 5, 7, 9 and 10)
- Steve Chase – producer (tracks 2, 5, 7, 9 and 10)
- Tim Palmer – mixing (all except track 6)
- Lennart Nilsson – cover photography
- Simon Fowler – band photography
- Andy Ekins – passport portraits
- Stylorouge – design

== Charts and certifications ==
=== Weekly charts ===
Chart performance for Seven
Chart (1992)	Peak position
Australian Albums (ARIA)	123
Swedish Albums (Sverigetopplistan)	45
UK Albums (Official Charts)	2

=== Certifications ===
Region	Certification	Certified units/sales
United Kingdom (BPI)	Gold	100,000^{^}
^{^} Shipments figures based on certification alone.
