= Gold Mother =

1990 studio album by James

Studio album by James
- Released: 4 June 1990
- Recorded: Mid 1989
- Studio: Out of the Blue, Manchester; The Windings, Wrexham
- Genre: Arena rock, indie rock
- Length: 51:26
- Label: Fontana
- Producer: Tim Booth; Larry Gott; Jim Glennie; Nick Garside

James chronology
One Man Clapping (1989)	Gold Mother (1990)	Seven (1992)

Singles from Gold Mother
- 1. "Come Home" Released: 20 November 1989; 2. "How Was It for You" Released: 30 April 1990; 3. "Come Home (Flood mix)" Released: 25 June 1990; 4. "Lose Control" Released: 26 November 1990; 5. "Sit Down" Released: 18 March 1991

Gold Mother is the third studio album by English rock band James. It was released on 4 June 1990 on Fontana Records. With the addition of drummer David Baynton-Power, violinist/guitarist Saul Davies, and keyboardist Mark Hunter, James released the single "Sit Down" in June 1989, before going to record their next album. Sessions were held at Out of the Blue in Manchester, The Windings in Wrexham, Wales, with three band members and Nick Garside producing. Described as an arena rock and indie rock album, Gold Mother was compared to the likes of U2 and the Waterboys.

"Come Home" was released, through Rough Trade Records, as the lead single from Gold Mother in November 1989. Following this, the band switched from Rough Trade to Phonogram sublabel Fontana Records. "How Was It for You" appeared as the second single in April 1990; two months later, the band embarked on a UK tour. A Flood mix of "Come Home" was released as the album's third single in June 1990, followed by fourth single "Lose Control" in November 1990. The band ended the year with shows in the United Kingdom and Russia. A re-recorded version of "Sit Down" was released the album's fifth and final single in March 1991. Following this, Gold Mother was reissued in May 1991, with the Flood mix of "Come Home", "Lose Control", and "Sit Down" replacing some of the tracks.

Gold Mother received generally positive reviews from music critics, some of whom noted the album to contain some of James' best tracks. It initially reached number 16 in the UK; the reissue peaked at number two. "How Was It for You", the Flood mix of "Come Home", "Lose Control", and "Sit Down" all reached the top 40 in the UK, with "Sit Down" reaching the highest at number two. Gold Mother appeared on year-end album lists by the likes of NME, Melody Maker, and Vox, among others. In the UK, the album was certified gold, while "Sit Down" was certified platinum.

== Background ==
James released their second studio album Strip-mine in September 1988, through Sire and Blanco y Negro Records. While making it, two of Sire's popular acts (the Housemartins and the Smiths) had broken up, and were anticipating James to be their next breakthrough artist. The album had been delayed from release by Sire on eight different occasions, and was remixed at the insistence of the band's managers Eliot Rashman and Andy Dodd. Sometime later, Rashman and Dodd resigned, and McDonagh, who had managed the band previously, was reinstated. Two months after the album's release, the band left Sire.

Around this time, keyboardist Mark Armistead joined the band on a part-time basis; drummer Gavan Whelan was asked to leave in December 1988. They continued to gig, some shows featured Gary Rostock of Easterhouse or Mike Pickering's girlfriend as substitutes, until the following month when they were auditioning for a replacement. During these auditions, the band came up with several new songs through improvisations. The try-outs were unfruitful; based on a tip-off from Dodd, the band learned of a drummer from Wales, David Baynton-Power.

Baynton-Power knew Dodd through a bandmate, and was sceptical about joining James as he had been previously conned out of money. After Baynton-Power joined, guitarist Larry Gott went to the Band on the Wall venue in Manchester to visit a friend. It was during an open mic night there that Gott witnessed, and was subsequently impressed, by violinist/guitarist Saul Davies. Davies had previously seen the band live in 1982; the day after meeting Gott, Davies auditioned for the rest of James. James released the live album One Man Clapping in March 1989 as a joint venture between their own label One Man Clapping and Rough Trade Records.

One Man Clapping was promoted with a UK tour, which saw the live debut of Baynton-Power and Davies. After the tour, the band recorded and released "Sit Down" as a single in June 1989. Armistead had declined to become a full-time member of the band, and suggested they check out Mark Hunter. The latter was brought into the "Sit Down" session to add an improvised keyboard part to the track, and soon became a member of the band. A UK tour was undertaken to promote "Sit Down" in June 1989. Potential success for the song was halted due to the music video being banned by the Musicians' Union.

== Production ==
Happy with the success of One Man Clapping, Rough Trade founder Geoff Travis agreed to fund the band's next studio album. Following this, the band recorded Gold Mother over the course of two months with frontman Tim Booth, Gott, bassist Jim Glennie, and Nick Garside – who had previously produced on the band's early EPs – serving as producers. The sessions were initially held at Out of the Blue in Manchester. Around this time, the Madchester was exploding in popularity, which saw several acts that had supported James in the past – namely, the Happy Mondays, the Stone Roses, and the Inspiral Carpets – become successful. Gott was bitter about the experience: "They were getting the star treatment", such as big-name producers and working on expensive recording consoles, while also approaching the band for advice, "you're up there and look where we are, back with Nick in Out Of the Blue".

When watching the Happy Mondays live, the band noticed them using a drum machine. Booth said James were against using non-organic instruments in their songs, until seeing the Happy Mondays use it, which convinced the band to "stop worrying [...] and realise that you can get away with everything if it sounds good". They experimented with the Madchester sound, with it directly influencing "Come Home", a track that was written in the studio. Booth wanted to re-record "Sit Down" during the sessions in a faster form, similar to how the band was playing it live. Recording then moved The Windings in Wrexham, Wales, close to Baynton-Power's house. Vinny Corrigan, who was a big fan of the band, and trumpeter Andy Diagram of the Diagram Brothers were brought into the sessions. Though, Corrigan's saxophone did not work well with the band's material, much to his dismay, they enjoyed Diagram's contributions. Glennie said the latter's work was "very odd, [with] lots of effects, [and] very experimental". Diagram had known the band when he was giving them a lift back home after a show in 1983. By the time James was recording, he was living with the person that printed their t-shirts. When Diagram was told that James was looking for people to sweeten the recordings, him and Corrigan visited the studio. Diagram initially added trumpet to "Gold Mother", before being invited to add it to other songs they had recorded. The album was mixed at Square One in Bury; Tim Palmer remixed "How Was It for You".

== Composition and lyrics ==
Musically, the sound of Gold Mother has been described as arena rock, and indie rock, compared to the likes of U2 and the Waterboys. Author Michael Heatley said the band's sound varied too much to consider Gold Mother part of the Madchester sound, in favour of arena rock and influences from folk. John Slater played additional percussion on "Come Home" and "You Can't Tell How Much Suffering (On a Face That's Always Smiling)". Booth's girlfriend and the band's manager Martine McDonagh sung backing vocals on "Hang On" and "Crescendo", while the Inspiral Carpets contributed backing vocals on "Gold Mother", which also featured saxophone from Corrigan.

"Come Home" was written in an hour, and is based around Booth's separation from McDonagh, with whom he had a son. Booth said they had written the song accidentally, as they were trying to play "Sit Down"; it features a house-esque piano riff. "Government Walls" talks about the 1989 secrets act, and the case against Peter Wright. "God Only Knows" is an attack against people that think they are speaking for God, and organised religion as a whole. It opens with sample of a televangelist denouncing rock music as a tool used by the devil; he learned of the sample and later threatened to sue the band. "You Can't Tell How Much Suffering (On a Face That's Always Smiling)" discusses emotional restraint and British stoicism. "Crescendo" is an atmospheric track that was originally called "The Last Whale", with Miles Davies-esque trumpets from Diagram. The Stone Roses-indebted "How Was It for You" talks about consuming alcohol and doing drugs to avoid sexual guilt.

"Hang On" showcases the band's softer pop side, with its lyrics detailing the disintegration relationship between Booth and McDonagh. The ballad "Walking the Ghost" is driven by Glennie's bass parts, and is about the ghost of a woman revisiting her former home, akin to the work of the Triffids. The title-track "Gold Mother" is about women finding courage after child birth, and the birth of his son Ben. Booth originally wrote it about Margaret Thatcher and greed, but changed topics after his girlfriend had given birth. In spite of this, he retained some lyrics from its first incarnation as he felt they were still relevant. It was edited together from two separate improvisations, and later given overdubs. The album's closing track, "Top of the World", is a ballad full of country blues guitarwork from Gott, and was reminiscent of Brian Eno's Apollo: Atmospheres and Soundtracks (1983). The baggy track "Lose Control" was written by Booth at night about an insomniac being burdened by fear and doubt.

== Release ==
In September 1989, James headlined a benefit for the Campaign for Nuclear Disarmament. The release of the "Come Home" single was promoted with a month-long tour of the UK, with support from the Band of Holy Joy; Diagram joined James for this stint. He was hesitant at first, due to the implosion of his band Dislocation Dance, and a grow resentment to any kind of pop, as he was more enthralled by experimental jazz. During the London date of the tour, the band had learned from their sound engineer that Dave Bates of Fontana Records was in attendance, alongside A&R people from other labels.

Gold Mother was planned for release in February 1990; around this time, the band were in talks with Fontana's owner Phonogram as they had recently relaunched the label. While this was occurring, Rough Trade was struggling with insolvency issues. Travis expected the band to sell around 20,000 copies, and in response, they asked to be released from their contract from Rough Trade. The band wanted a label that had the ambition to sell more copies than Travis' estimation, and eventually signed with Fontana Records, who cleared their £50,000 debt to Sire.

Gold Mother was eventually released on 4 June 1990, through Fontana Records. The Japanese release included "Lazy" as an extra track between "Crescendo" and "How Was It for You". Following this, the band embarked on the World Cup Tour in the UK, which saw dates organised around the England team's matches in the World Cup. James appeared at Glastonbury Festival, and supported David Bowie and the Cure at separate one-off shows. In November 1990, they played their first show out of the UK in France. The following month, the band played a handful of UK shows, including two at the G-Mex Centre in their hometown of Manchester. The band had planned to close the year with a series of shows in Russia, though these were cancelled.

=== Singles ===
"Come Home" was released as lead single to Gold Mother in November 1989, with "Promised Land" and "Slow Right Down" as extra tracks. The success of it was hampered due to Music Week misprinting their top 100 singles, resulting in a loss of airplay and opportunities to appear on TV. "How Was It for You" was released as a single on 30 April 1990, with "Lazy", "Undertaker", live versions of "Whoops" and "Hymn from a Village", and remixes of "How Was It For You" as extra tracks. The music video for "How Was It for You" was directed by Swivel, and sees Booth singing underwater. In spite of it charting well, the band were not allowed to appear on Top of the Pops, with the show refusing to air the video in the event younger viewers would attempt to recreate it.

A remix of "Come Home", done by Flood, was released as a single on 25 June 1990, with "Dreaming Up Tomorrow", "Fire Away", live versions of "Stutter" and "Come Home", and remixes of "Come Home" and "Gold Mother" as extra tracks. One of the "Come Home" remixes sampled "Skullduggery", a track from the band's debut studio album Stutter (1986). "Lose Control", produced by Flood, was released as a single on 26 November 1990, with a cover of the Velvet Underground's "Sunday Morning" (1966) and "Out to Get You" as extra tracks. The band performed "Lose Control" on The Word in November 1990. The re-recorded version of "Sit Down", produced by Gil Norton, was released as a single on 18 March 1991, with "Tonight" and a live version of "Sit Down" as extra tracks. The music video for "Sit Down" was directed by Gavin Taylor. The label wanted the track to follow-up the Flood mix of "Come Home", however, the band wanted to release new material instead, opting for "Lose Control".

== Reissues and related releases ==
On 15 April 1991, the band's first video album Come Home Live was released, filmed at the December 1990 Manchester shows. Gold Mother was re-released in May 1991. The original version of "Come Home", "Crescendo", and "Hang On" were replaced by the Flood mix of "Come Home", "Lose Control", and "Sit Down". Fans were able to swap their original copies for the reissues at Our Price stores. The album was released in the US in July 1991 under the name James, with the addition of "Sit Down" and "Lose Control". In August, the band headlined Reading Festival.

A remix of "Sit Down", done by Apollo 440, was released as a single in 1998. The Flood mix of "Come Home", "Sit Down", "Lose Control", and "How Was It for You" were included on the band's first and fourth compilation albums The Best Of (1998) and Fresh as a Daisy – The Singles (2007). "Sit Down", "Gold Mother", and a remix of "Lose Control" were included on the band's third compilation album The Collection (2004).

The music videos for "How Was It for You", "Come Home, "Lose Control", and "Sit Down" were included on the career-spanning box set The Gathering Sound (2012), alongside demos of "Sit Down" and "How Was It for You", and Come Home Live on DVD. Gold Mother was reissued on CD in 2001, with the 1991 track listing, alongside the addition of "Crescendo", "Hang On", a remix of "Come Home", and live versions of "Lose Control" and "Sit Down". Gold Mother was re-pressed on vinyl in 2017, with the 1991 track listing, alongside the inclusion of "Crescendo", "Hang On", and the version of "Come Home" that was replaced on the re-issue.

== Reception ==
Professional ratings
Review scores
Source	Rating
AllMusic	4/5 stars
The Great Rock Discography	8/10
NME	8/10
Q	3/5 stars
Sounds	3/5 stars
ZigZag	9/10

Gold Mother was met with generally positive reviews from music critics. ZigZag writer David Giles called the album the band's "finest collection of songs" since Stutter, adding that they "may be slightly less adventurous melodically" than their earlier work, "but age certainly hasn't dampened their ardour." Simon Williams of NME wrote that Gold Mother was "a bold, brazenly confident fulfillment of promises made" by the band's early tracks: "a multi-tiered extravaganza of organically upbeat intuition which challenges and chills with one hand and comforts with the other."

AllMusic reviewer Stephen Thomas Erlewine noted that while "a few of the tracks captured the sprawling, epic splendor that James wished to achieve," the band had "difficulty writing convincing material, and they aren't nearly as interesting as they were when they concentrated on jangling folk-pop [as seen in their early releases]." Sounds' Sam King said the album sees the band's "inherent wariness surface amid some of their most and ... least satisfying moments to date." He explained that the majority of Gold Mother "fails to live up to ... [the] heady standards" of the first few tracks, as it showcases "misjudged pre-'90s indie drivel." Martin Aston of Q wrote that the album "bears all the signs of intelligence and sensitivity, but it's still not the totally rewarding album James are capable of mining."

Gold Mother was placed by NME and Melody Maker at number 5 and 47, respectively, on their album of the year lists. The original release of Gold Mother reached number 16 in the UK, while the 1991 re-released peaked at number 2. "Come Home" initially charted at number 84, while the Flood mix peaked at number 32. "How Was It for You" peaked at number 32, "Lose Control" peaked at number 38, and "Sit Down" peaked at number 2. Gold Mother was later certified gold in the UK, and "Sit Down" was certified platinum.

== Track listing ==
All tracks composed by Tim Booth, Jim Glennie, and Larry Gott, except "Top of the World" and "Sit Down" by Booth, Glennie, Gott, and Gavan Whelan.

Gold Mother – original 1990 release

1. "Come Home" – 5:00
2. "Government Walls" – 5:47
3. "God Only Knows" – 4:40
4. "You Can't Tell How Much Suffering (On a Face That's Always Smiling)" – 2:56
5. "Crescendo" – 7:01
6. "How Was It for You" – 4:04
7. "Hang On" – 4:03
8. "Walking the Ghost" – 6:13
9. "Gold Mother" – 7:53
10. "Top of the World" – 3:49

Gold Mother – 1991 re-issue

1. "Come Home" (Flood mix) – 3:58
2. "Lose Control" – 4:04
3. "Government Walls" – 5:47
4. "God Only Knows" – 4:40
5. "You Can't Tell How Much Suffering (On a Face That's Always Smiling)" – 2:56
6. "How Was It for You" – 4:04
7. "Sit Down" – 4:07
8. "Walking the Ghost" – 6:13
9. "Gold Mother" – 7:53
10. "Top of the World" – 3:49

James – American 1991 release

1. "Sit Down" – 4:07
2. "Come Home" – 5:00
3. "Government Walls" – 5:47
4. "God Only Knows" – 4:40
5. "You Can't Tell How Much Suffering (On a Face That's Always Smiling)" – 2:56
6. "How Was It for You" – 4:04
7. "Lose Control" – 4:04
8. "Walking the Ghost" – 6:13
9. "Gold Mother" – 7:53
10. "Top of the World" – 3:49

== Personnel ==
Personnel per booklet.

James

- Tim Booth – vocals
- Jim Glennie – bass guitar, backing vocals
- Larry Gott – guitar, backing vocals
- Saul Davies – violin, guitar, cowbell
- Andy Diagram – trumpet, backing vocals
- David Baynton-Power – drums, percussion
- Mark Hunter – keyboards, accordion

Additional musicians

- John Slater – percussion ("Come Home" and "How Much Suffering")
- Martine McDonagh – backing vocals ("Hang On" and "Crescendo")
- Inspiral Carpets – backing vocals ("Gold Mother")
- Vinny Corrigan – saxophone ("Gold Mother")

Production and design

- Tim Booth – producer
- Larry Gott – producer
- Jim Glennie – producer
- Nick Garside – producer, engineer
- Tim Palmer – remix ("How Was It for You")
- Vladimiar Bagrianski – photo
- Adrian Wilson – photo
- Christopher Lord – design

Additional credits on the 1991 re-issue

- Flood – remix ("Come Home"), producer ("Lose Control")
- Mark McGuire – mixing ("Lose Control")
- Gil Norton – producer ("Sit Down")
- Dave Bascombe – mixing ("Sit Down")

== Charts and certifications ==
=== Weekly charts ===
Chart performance for Gold Mother
Chart (1990)	Peak position
UK Albums (OCC)	16
Chart (1991)	Peak position
Australian Albums (ARIA)	174
UK Albums (OCC)	2

=== Certifications ===
Region	Certification	Certified units/sales
United Kingdom (BPI)	Gold	100,000^{^}
^{^} Shipments figures based on certification alone.
