= Sound (song) =

1991 single by James

Single by James

from the album Seven
- B-side: "All My Sons"
- Released: 18 November 1991
- Length: 4:04
- Label: Fontana
- Songwriters: Tim Booth; Larry Gott; Jim Glennie; James
- Producer: Youth

James singles chronology
"Sit Down" (1991)	"Sound" (1991)	"Born of Frustration" (1992)

"Sound" is a song written by Jim Glennie, Larry Gott, and Tim Booth, recorded by Manchester band James for their fourth studio album, Seven (1992). Clocking in at over six and a half minutes on the album, the song was shortened considerably for the single version. The CD release featured both the album and the single version, along with a dub remix of "Come Home" and an original song called "All My Sons".

Released in November 1991 by Fontana Records as the album's first single, it reached No. 9 on the UK Singles Chart, becoming the second of the group's three top-10 hits. "Sound" also peaked at No. 4 in Portugal and No. 28 in Australia.

== Track listings ==
UK 7-inch and cassette single

1. "Sound"
2. "All My Sons"

UK and Australian CD single

1. "Sound" (7-inch edit)
2. "Come Home" (Youth Pressure mix)
3. "All My Sons"
4. "Sound" (full version)

UK 12-inch single

A1. "Sound" (full version)
A2. "Sound" (edit)
B1. "Come Home" (Youth Pressure dub mix)
B2. "All My Sons"

== Charts ==
Chart (1991–1992)	Peak position
Australia (ARIA)	28
Europe (Eurochart Hot 100)	39
Ireland (IRMA)	15
Israel (IBA)	15
Luxembourg (Radio Luxembourg)	5
Portugal (AFP)	4
UK Singles (Official Charts)	9
UK Airplay (Music Week)	4

== Release history ==
Region	Date	Format(s)	Label(s)	Ref.
United Kingdom	18 November 1991	7-inch vinyl; 12-inch vinyl; CD; cassette	Fontana	
Australia	2 March 1991	CD; cassette	Fontana	
