= Born of Frustration =

1992 single by James

Single by James

from the album Seven
- B-side: "Be My Prayer"
- Released: 20 January 1992
- Length: 4:21 (album version); 5:25 (single version)
- Label: Fontana
- Songwriters: Tim Booth; Larry Gott; Jim Glennie
- Producer: Youth

James singles chronology
"Sound" (1991)	"Born of Frustration" (1992)	"Ring the Bells" (1993)

"Born of Frustration" is a song written by Jim Glennie, Larry Gott, and Tim Booth and released as a single by English Madchester band James. It is the follow-up to 1991 hits "Sit Down" and "Sound", which both peaked within the UK top 10.

The song was released in January 1992 by Fontana Records from the group's fourth album, Seven (1992), and reached number 13 in the United Kingdom. It was also a hit on US alternative radio, peaking at number five on the Billboard Modern Rock Tracks chart; it was the group's highest placement on this ranking until "Laid" reached number three in 1993.

== Track listings ==
- UK 7-inch and cassette single
1. "Born of Frustration"
2. "Be My Prayer"
- UK CD and 12-inch single
1. "Born of Frustration"
2. "Be My Prayer"
3. "Sound" ('Diceman' mix)
- Japanese mini-CD single
1. "Born of Frustration"
2. "Sit Down" (live)

== Charts ==
=== Weekly charts ===
Chart (1992)	Peak position
Australia (ARIA)	134
Europe (Eurochart Hot 100)	41
Israel (Israeli Singles Chart)	4
Netherlands (Single Top 100)	69
UK Singles (Official Charts)	13
UK Airplay (Music Week)	8
US Alternative Airplay (Billboard)	5

=== Year-end charts ===
Chart (1992)	Position
US Modern Rock Tracks (Billboard)	16

== Certifications ==
Region	Certification	Certified units/sales
United Kingdom (BPI)	Silver	200,000^{‡}
^{‡} Sales+streaming figures based on certification alone.

== Release history ==
Region	Date	Format(s)	Label(s)	Ref.
United Kingdom	20 January 1992	7-inch vinyl; 12-inch vinyl; CD; cassette	Fontana	
Japan	25 April 1992	Mini-CD	Fontana	
Australia	15 June 1992	CD; cassette	Fontana	
