= Come Home (James song) =

- 1989 single cover

Single by James

from the album Gold Mother
- B-side: "Promised Land"; "Slow Right Down"; "Dreaming Up Tomorrow"; "Fireaway"; "Stutter"; "Gold Mother"
- Released: 20 November 1989
- Recorded: 1988
- Genre: Madchester
- Length: 3:53 (1989, 7" version); 5:04 (1989, long version); 3:59 (1990, Flood mix); 6:10 (1990, extended Flood mix)
- Label: Rough Trade (1989); Fontana (1990)
- Songwriter(s): Jim Glennie; Larry Gott; Tim Booth
- Producer(s): Jim Glennie; Larry Gott; Nick Garside; Tim Booth

James singles chronology
"Sit Down" (1989)	"Come Home" (1989)	"How Was It for You" (1990)

"Come Home" is a song by English rock band James, first released as a single in November 1989 by Rough Trade. Like the preceding single, "Sit Down", it received little attention initially and led to James parting ways with Rough Trade. After Mercury Records had signed the band to the Fontana label and experienced chart success with "How Was It for You" they re-released "Come Home" on 25 June 1990 in a version remixed by Flood.

The original release had artwork by Central Station Design while the re-release repeated the design of the "How Was It for You" singles, with the words "come" and "home" on the front and back covers, respectively, with different background colours marking the various formats. The song featured on the influential 1990 'Madchester' compilation album Happy Daze.

== Track listings ==
=== 1989 release ===
7" vinyl

- UK: Rough Trade / RT245

Side one
No.	Title	Length
1.	"Come Home" (7" version)	3:53

Side two
No.	Title	Length
1.	"Promised Land"	3:05

12" vinyl

- UK: Rough Trade / RTT245

Side one
No.	Title	Length
1.	"Come Home" (long version)	5:04

Side two
No.	Title	Length
1.	"Come Home" (7" version)	3:53
2.	"Promised Land"	3:05
3.	"Slow Right Down" (demo version)	4:03

CD

- UK: Rough Trade / RTT245CD

No.	Title	Length
1.	"Come Home" (long version)	5:04
2.	"Come Home" (7" version)	3:54
3.	"Promised Land"	3:07
4.	"Slow Right Down" (demo version)	4:02

=== 1990 release ===
7" vinyl and cassette

- UK: Fontana / JIM6 (7" vinyl), JIMMC6 (cassette)

Side one
No.	Title	Length
1.	"Come Home" (Flood mix)	3:56

Side two
No.	Title	Length
1.	"Dreaming Up Tomorrow"	3:07

12" vinyl

- UK: Fontana / JIM612 (purple cover)

Side one
No.	Title	Length
1.	"Come Home" (extended Flood mix)	6:07

Side two
No.	Title	Length
1.	"Fireaway"	3:44
2.	"Stutter" (recorded live at Manchester Apollo by Piccadilly Key 103 FM)	6:30

- UK: Fontana / JIMM612 (green cover)

Side one
No.	Title	Length
1.	"Come Home" (live)	5:06
2.	"Gold Mother" (remixed by Warp)	5:43

Side two
No.	Title	Length
1.	"Come Home" (remix; by Andrew Weatherall)	8:26

CD

- UK: Fontana / JIMCD6

No.	Title	Length
1.	"Come Home" (Flood mix)	3:59
2.	"Come Home" (extended Flood mix)	6:10
3.	"Fireaway"	3:46
4.	"Gold Mother" (remixed by Warp)	5:45

== Chart performance ==
1989 chart performance for "Come Home"
Chart (1989)	Peak position
UK Singles Chart	84

1990 chart performance for "Come Home"
Chart (1990)	Peak position
UK Singles Chart	32
