= Sit Down (song) =

1989 single by James

Single by James

from the album Gold Mother (re-recorded version)
- Written: Late 1988
- Released: 19 June 1989
- Genre: Madchester; indie dance
- Length: 8:39 (original); 4:05 (re-release)
- Label: Rough Trade (1989); Fontana
- Songwriters: Jim Glennie; Larry Gott; Tim Booth; Gavan Whelan
- Producers: Gil Norton; Steve Power (1991 version)

James singles chronology
"Ya Ho" (1988)	"Sit Down" (1989)	"Come Home" (1989)

Official video (1991 version)
- "Sit Down" on YouTube

Re-release cover
- Cover of the 1991 release on Fontana

James singles chronology
"Lose Control" (1990)	"Sit Down (re-recording)" (1991)	"Sound" (1991)

James singles chronology
"Runaground" (1998)	"Sit Down '98 (Apollo 440 mix)" (1998)	"I Know What I'm Here For" (1999)

"Sit Down" is a song by English band James, originally released in June 1989 by Rough Trade Records. In its eight-and-a-half-minute original form, the song reached number 77 in the UK Singles Chart and was ranked number eight in John Peel's end of year BBC Radio 1 show Festive Fifty of 1989.

After experiencing success as part of the Madchester music scene, a new version was released in March 1991 that was shorter and with new lyrics. Released via Fontana Records, "Sit Down" reached number two on the UK Singles Chart, spending three weeks there. It was the 20th best-selling single of 1991 in the UK. A remix by Apollo 440 was released as a standalone single in 1998, reaching number seven in the band's native UK.

In 2013, the song placed fourth in a poll by BBC Radio 2 and the Official Charts Company to find the greatest track to miss out on the number-one spot in the UK charts. In the same year, James performed the song with Peter Kay for Comic Relief. On 30 March 2017 a version of the song was used in the promo of the seventh season of the hit HBO series Game of Thrones.

== Background ==
The song's lyrics were written in late 1988 as a homage to author Doris Lessing and singer Patti Smith, who had inspired James' lead singer Tim Booth. Booth told the Daily Record in June 2004: "Sit Down is about me feeling so alone in my 20s and reading books by a writer called Doris Lessing which made me realise I wasn't. It was about being awake at 4am and having no-one to talk to."

In a 2014 interview with Dave Simpson of The Guardian on the effect of the song, James guitarist Larry Gott stated, "Sit Down is one of those songs that encourages people to put their arms around strangers. As soon as we launch into the opening bars, they start smiling. Then they turn to someone next to them or their girlfriend or boyfriend and hug them, and then they start singing every single word. As a musician, that's incredibly humbling." The original cover depicts an image of the former Fulham goalkeeper Tony Macedo.

== Music videos ==
The music video for the original 1989 Rough Trade release was directed by Ed Barton. It features Booth wearing a kaftan, against a white background, with the band performing the song. At one stage Booth hugs a sheep. The video was banned for two weeks by the Musicians Union as Jim Glennie took the role of a drummer, which the union felt displaced a professional musician.

Another video was made for the 1991 re-release, which featured the band performing the song in front of a live audience.

== Track listings ==
=== 1989 original release ===
1. "Sit Down" (7-inch and 8:31 extended version on 12-inch)
2. "Goin' Away" (12-inch and CD)
3. "Sound Investment" (12-inch and CD)
4. "Sky Is Falling" (7-inch, 12-inch and CD)

=== 1991 release ===
1. "Sit Down" (new version) (7-inch, 12-inch and CD)
2. "Tonight" (12-inch and CD)
3. "Sunday Morning" (Canadian CD)
4. "Sit Down" (live at G-Mex) (7-inch, 12-inch and CD)

=== "Sit Down '98" ===
- CD1
1. "Sit Down '98" (Apollo 440 remix)
2. "Sit Down" (original)
3. "China Girl" (Radio One Iggy Pop tribute)
- CD2
1. "Sit Down '98" (Apollo 440 remix)
2. "What For" (Glr Session)
3. "Sit Down" (Glr Session)

== Charts ==
=== Weekly charts ===
"Sit Down"

Chart (1989)	Peak position
Australia (ARIA)	88
UK Singles (Official Charts)	77

Chart (1991)	Peak position
Australia (ARIA)	141
Austria (Ö3 Austria Top 40)	27
Europe (Eurochart Hot 100)	6
Europe (European Hit Radio)	14
Germany (GfK)	56
Ireland (IRMA)	5
Israel (Israeli Singles Chart)	5
Luxembourg (Radio Luxembourg)	3
Netherlands (Dutch Top 40 Tipparade)	9
Netherlands (Single Top 100)	42
UK Singles (Official Charts)	2
UK Airplay (Music Week)	8
US Alternative Airplay (Billboard)	9

"Sit Down '98"

Chart (1998)	Peak position
Europe (Eurochart Hot 100)	32
Scottish Singles Sales (Official Charts)	5
UK Singles (Official Charts)	7

=== Year-end charts ===
"Sit Down"

Chart (1991)	Position
Europe (Eurochart Hot 100)	93
Europe (European Hit Radio)	85
UK Singles (OCC)	20

"Sit Down '98"

Chart (1998)	Position
UK Singles (OCC)	200

== Certifications ==
Region	Certification	Certified units/sales
United Kingdom (BPI)	Platinum	600,000^{‡}
^{‡} Sales+streaming figures based on certification alone.

== Release history ==
Region	Version	Date	Format(s)	Label(s)	Ref(s).
United Kingdom	Original	19 June 1989	7-inch vinyl; 12-inch vinyl	Rough Trade	
United Kingdom	Original	26 June 1989	CD	Rough Trade	
United Kingdom	1991 version	18 March 1991	7-inch vinyl; 12-inch vinyl; CD; cassette	Fontana	
Australia	1991 version	24 June 1991	CD; cassette	Fontana	
United Kingdom	"Sit Down '98"	9 November 1998	CD; cassette	Fontana	

== In popular culture ==
On 4 June 2017, Coldplay performed "Sit Down" at the One Love Manchester benefit concert for the victims of the Manchester Arena bombing, before performing their song "Fix You".

Fans of Premier League club Liverpool rewrote the lyrics of this song in 2018 as a new terrace chant for 2017–18 Premier League Golden Boot winner Mohamed Salah. Booth thought the version was witty and welcomed its use for Salah.
