= David Baynton-Power =

British musician

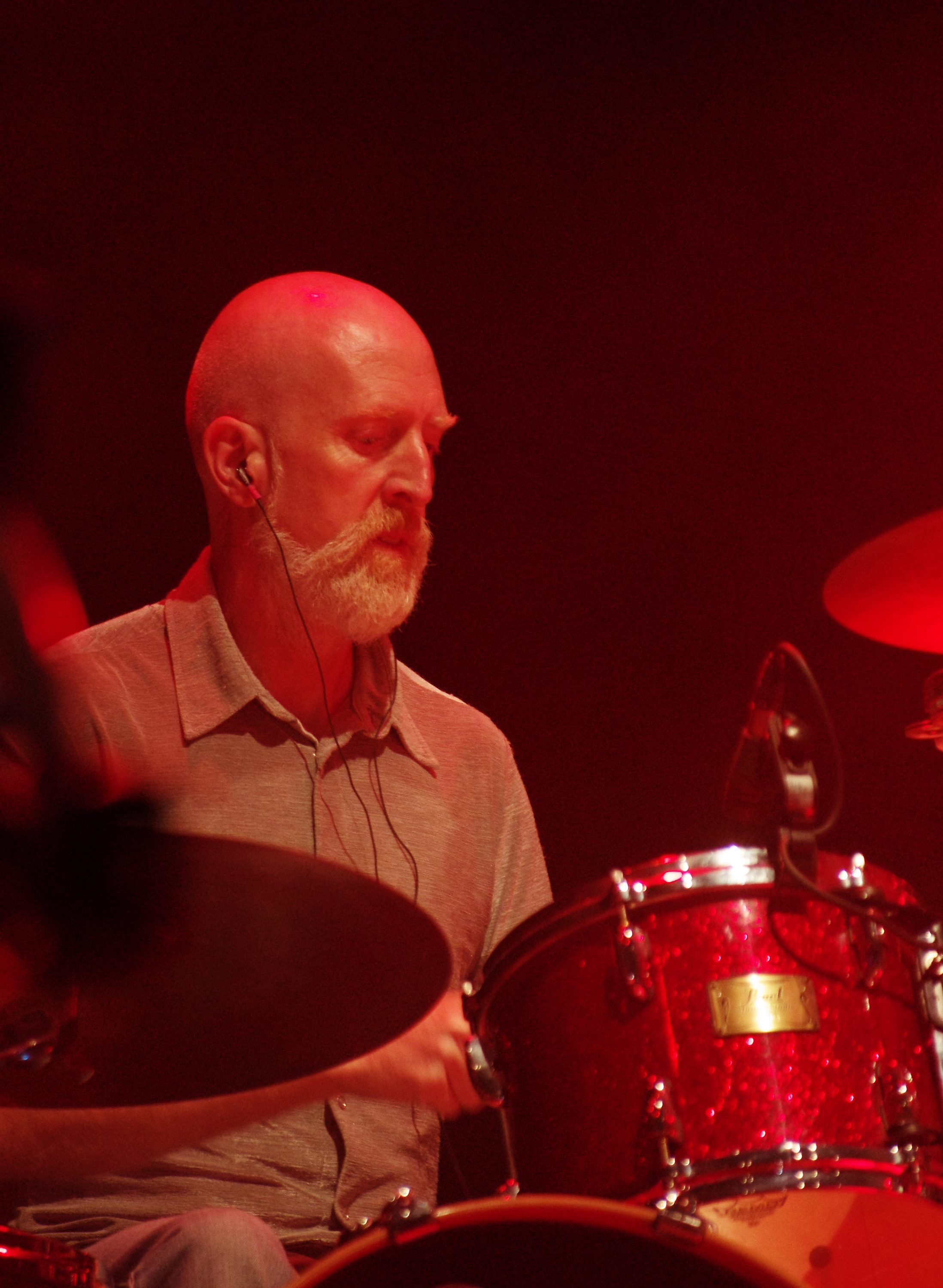
- Dave Baynton-Power performing with James at Haldern Pop 2013

Background information
- Born: 29 January 1961 (age 65); Kent, UK
- Member of: James (1988–2001, 2007–present)
- Formerly of: The Modernaires/Brodyr Y Ffin

David Baynton-Power (born 29 January 1961, in Kent, England) is a musician, best known as drummer of the long-existing English rock band James. He has a recognizable and characteristic way of playing the drums, moving his sticks in a circular motion as the songs build up.

== Career ==
Progressive rock was his first real venture into playing drums, but Baynton-Power became a huge fan of punk rock and was part of the new wave movement with his first real band, The Modernaires. They played some decent sized gigs for a new band, but they soon split after moving to Chester as their vocalist, who has schizophrenia, announced he was leaving.

They soon re-formed with a new singer however, they realized that with the arrival of the Welsh TV station S4C, if they changed the lyrics of their songs from English to Welsh they could make some profit. They changed their name to Brodyr Y Ffin (Welsh for 'Brothers on the Border') as their house in Chester was right on the Anglo-Welsh border, and quickly rose to the top of the Welsh scene, staying there for a few years.

However, their existence came to an abrupt end with a massive house fire, which resulted in the death of one of their members. Not long after, Baynton-Power was linked to James through another band's keyboardist, who was a friend of Andy Dodd – Dodd initially booked all the bands at the Band on the Wall venue in Manchester. Dodd suggested Baynton-Power as a replacement for James's previous drummer Gavan Whelan in 1989. According to the band's biography Folklore by Stuart Maconie, the band was particularly keen to hire Baynton-Power after lead singer Tim Booth's psychic medium advised him to look out for a "Dave from Wrexham" as the band's new drummer. Although Baynton-Power was initially uninterested in the offer of an audition, he finally relented after the band members offered to pay his train fare to Manchester. Following the audition they immediately offered him the role of drummer.

Baynton-Power endured, remaining in James from that time through to their farewell tour in December 2001. He also played a big part in the production side of the later James albums, from Whiplash onwards.

From 2002 Baynton-Power toured with the Welsh rock band The Alarm, spent more time with his family, and also worked as a freelance sound engineer in television. In early 2007, he was confirmed as a member of the reformed James and joined them on their tour in April of that year, then played on their comeback album Hey Ma, released in April 2008.

== Personal life ==
He has a daughter, Saskia. Baynton-Power is the grandson of Harry Baynton-Power and Olive Turner, both composers for film and television.
