= Laid (song) =

1993 single by James

Single by James

from the album Laid
- B-side: "Wah Wah Kits"; "The Lake"; "Seconds Away"; "Five-O"
- Released: 1 November 1993
- Genre: Pop; indie rock
- Length: 2:36
- Label: Fontana
- Songwriters: Tim Booth; Larry Gott; Jim Glennie
- Producer: Brian Eno

James singles chronology
"Sometimes" (1993)	"Laid" (1993)	"Jam J" / "Say Something" (1994)

"Laid" is the title track from Laid, the fifth studio album of Manchester alternative rock band James. Released on 1 November 1993 by Fontana Records, the song was a commercial success, charting in the United Kingdom, Australia, and the United States. "Laid" has received attention as a theme song for the American Pie film series.

== Composition and reception ==
The song includes the lyric "she only comes when she's on top". The American release of its music video replaced this lyric with "she only sings when she's on top" (although Tim Booth is seen to lip-sync the original line, and is accompanied by a subtitle reading "hums").

It quickly gained popularity on American college radio and remains the group's best-known song in the United States.

The song peaked at numbers 61 and 68 on the US Billboard Hot 100 and Cash Box Top 100 charts, and number three on the Billboard Modern Rock Tracks chart, in part due to its cult status as a popular college song in the US. The song was more successful in the band's native UK, where it peaked at number 25, becoming the band's ninth top-40 hit.

One of the Three, the 'unofficial archive of the band James', has said this of the song:

Originally viewed by the band as a throwaway song and a possible b-side, Brian Eno soon convinced them of the potential of this track. Whilst only reaching a disappointing 22 in the UK charts, it made serious inroads for the band in the US where it led to performances on prime-time TV shows such as Letterman, Conan O'Brien and Jay Leno.

== Music video ==
The accompanying music video for "Laid" was directed by London-based director Zanna and produced by Deidre Allen for M-Ocean. It was released on 1 November 1993 and in the video, men in dresses redefine gender roles.

== Usage in American Pie ==
In the late 1990s and early 2000s, the song gained additional exposure and popularity when it was used as the theme song for the American Pie films starring Jason Biggs and Seann William Scott. A cover by Matt Nathanson was recorded exclusively for the third film American Wedding, and was later included on the first spin-off American Pie Presents: Band Camp's soundtrack after previously only being in the first two films' trailers. The seventh installment in the franchise, The Book of Love, contains a cover of "Laid" by singer Aidan Hawken; as of 2012, it had yet to be released on any album or as a single. The eighth film, American Reunion, features the original version by James played during the film.

== Track listings ==
- UK CD1 and European CD single
1. "Laid"
2. "Wah Wah Kits"
3. "The Lake"
4. "Seconds Away"
- UK CD2
1. "Laid"
2. "Five-O"
3. "Say Something"
4. "Sometimes"
- UK 7-inch and cassette single; Australian CD and cassette single
1. "Laid"
2. "Wah Wah Kits"
- US cassette single

A1. "Laid" – 2:36
B1. "Say Something" (preview) – 0:50
B2. "Sometimes" (preview) – 1:00
B3. "Low Low Low" (preview) – 0:56

== Charts ==
=== Weekly charts ===
Chart (1993–1994)	Peak position
Australia (ARIA)	40
Europe (Eurochart Hot 100)	73
Israel (Israeli Singles Chart)	24
UK Singles (Official Charts)	25
US Billboard Hot 100	61
US Alternative Airplay (Billboard)	3
US Cash Box Top 100	68

=== Year-end charts ===
Chart (1994)	Position
US Modern Rock Tracks (Billboard)	39

== Certifications ==
Region	Certification	Certified units/sales
New Zealand (RMNZ)	Platinum	30,000^{‡}
United Kingdom (BPI)	2× Platinum	1,200,000^{‡}
^{‡} Sales+streaming figures based on certification alone.

== Release history ==
Region	Date	Format(s)	Label(s)	Ref.
United Kingdom	1 November 1993	7-inch vinyl; CD; cassette	Fontana	
Australia	28 March 1994	CD; cassette	Fontana	

== Covers ==
"Laid" was covered by New Orleans alt-rock band Better Than Ezra on their 2005 greatest hits compilation. It has been covered by the Butch Walker-led band 1969 on a hidden track on their album Maya.

English band Palma Violets performed a version of the song in July 2015 for The A.V. Club's A.V. Undercover series. The song has also been covered by The Pains of Being Pure at Heart.

== In popular culture ==
"Laid" gained attention as a theme song for the American Pie film series. The song was also used during the episode "Forever" of the FX series The Bear.

The song was also used prominently in the final episode of Shameless.
