= Larry Gott =

British musician (born 1957)

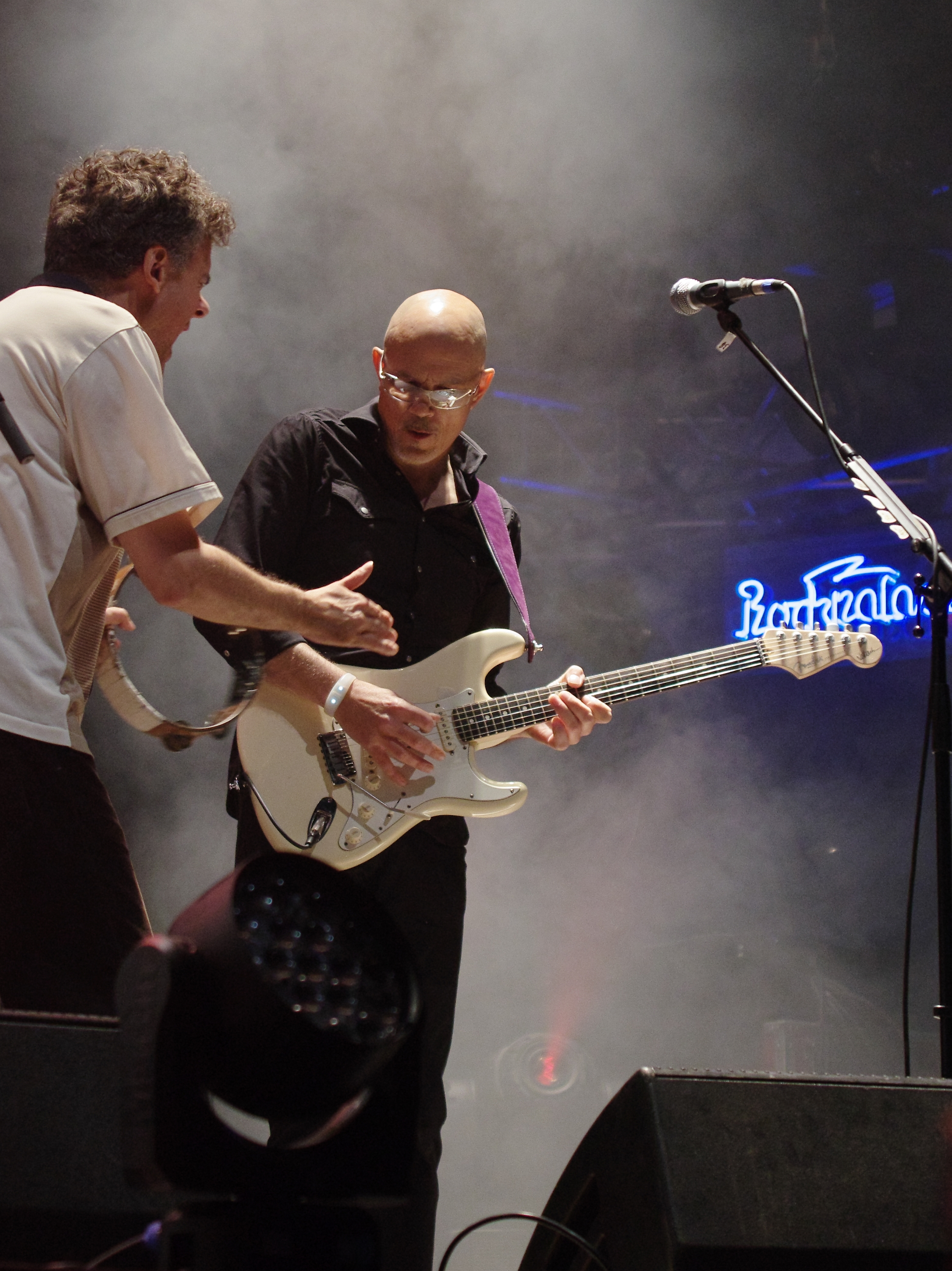
Larry Gott performing with James at Haldern Pop 2013

James Lawrence "Larry" Gott (born 24 July 1957) is an English musician, formerly of the band James, originating from Manchester. He is also a designer.

== Music ==
Within the band Gott mainly played guitar and provided backing vocals, but also featured on keyboards and the flute on earlier albums. Prior to joining the band, he had been the guitar tutor for founder members Jim Glennie and Paul Gilbertson. He was later invited to join the band after Gilbertson's playing began to decline due to his drug problems, which eventually led to Gilbertson's sacking. Gott was to remain with James throughout the heyday of their career, forming part of what was considered to be the core nucleus of James for a long time, together with singer Tim Booth and bassist Glennie.

Gott announced his intention to leave the band in 1995, after the Laid / Wah Wah albums. According to the band's Folklore biography by Stuart Maconie, he was exhausted from the pressures of touring and wanted to spend more time with his family. He stayed in close contact with the other band members during the following year, writing and recording most of the songs on the band's following album Whiplash effectively as a regular member.

He went on to study Art and Design and subsequently pursued a career designing furniture. He also taught music lessons at colleges around Manchester, including Manchester College of Arts and Technology.

Gott made two guest appearances on the band's so-called 'farewell tour' in 2001 at the MEN and Wembley Arenas. Following the band's apparent split, he started to work with bassist Glennie in low key, informal improvisation sessions.

During these intervening years, Gott also worked with Manchester maverick Edward Barton on an, as yet, unreleased album.

James reformed in January 2007, and Gott was at the centre of the reformation, reprising his duties as lead guitarist. In August 2015 he left the band for unspecified reasons; he was replaced by Adrian Oxaal on lead guitar.

== Design ==
Gott studied three-dimensional design at Manchester Metropolitan University graduating in 2000. His work, similar to his guitar playing, followed the Kiss principle, and found favour among the established design community. His 'reaction recliner' won many plaudits and awards including the Allemuir Award for Industry and the Blueprint Award for Creativity, presented by the Milanese architect Mario Bellini at the 2001 '100% design' show at London's Earls Court. An early prototype of this design resides in the permanent collection of the Manchester City Art Gallery.

Another of Gott's award-winning pieces, an outdoor chair and table set made from wire mesh, caught the eye of Sir Terence Conran and subsequently retailed in the Conran shops worldwide under Gott's brandname 'MeshMan'.
