= Tim Booth =

British actor and singer (b. 1960)

Timothy Booth
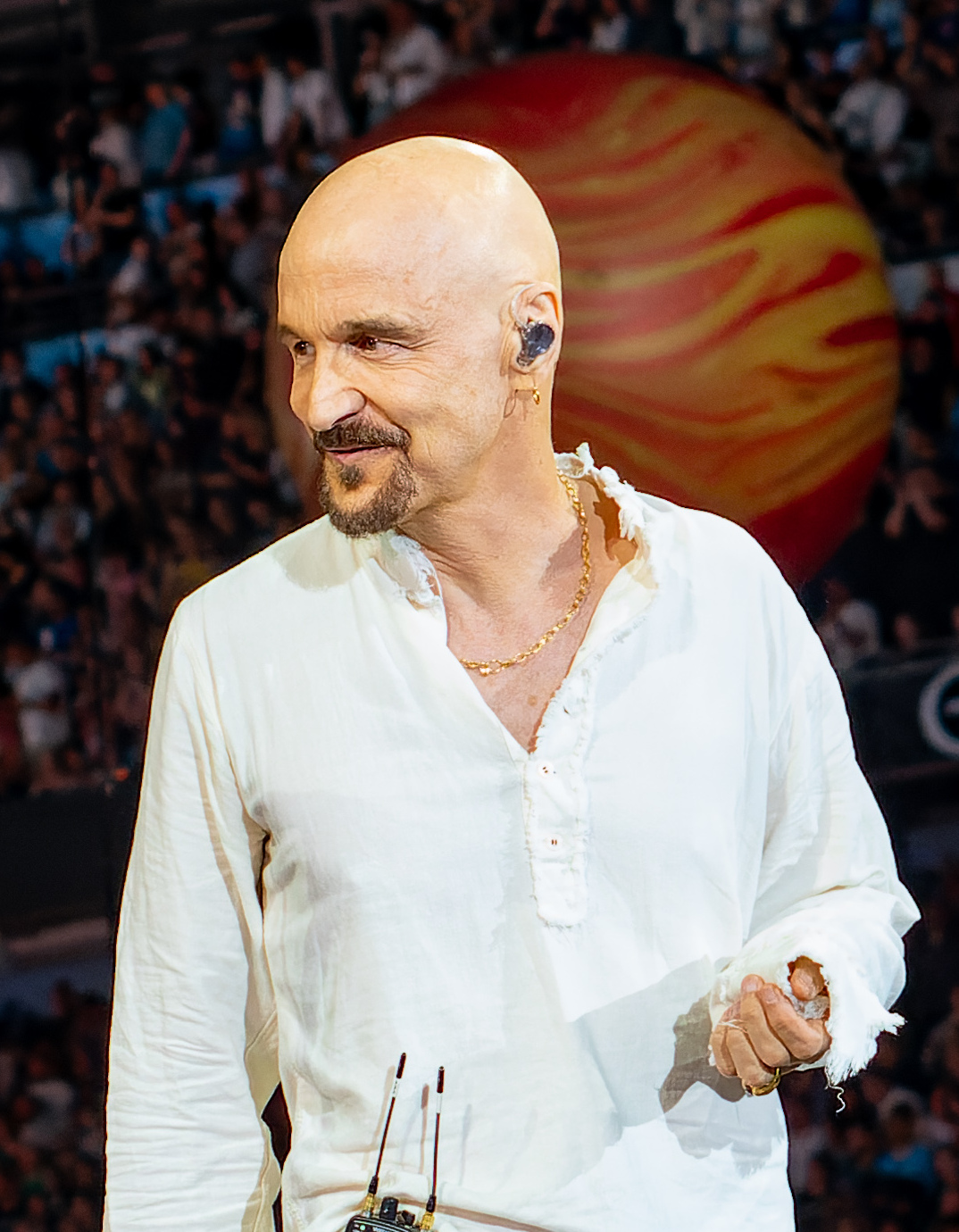
- Booth performing with Coldplay in 2023

Background information
- Born: 4 April 1960 (age 66); Bradford, West Yorkshire, UK
- Occupations: Singer; songwriter; dancer; actor
- Member of: James (1982–2001, 2007–present)
- Formerly of: Booth and the Bad Angel (1995–1998)

Timothy Booth (born 4 February 1960) is an English singer-songwriter, actor, author and dancer. He is the lead singer of the indie rock band James, and co-wrote several of their hit singles including "Sit Down", "Come Home", and "Laid". As an actor, Booth is also known for portraying Victor Zsasz in the 2005 film Batman Begins.

== Career ==
=== Early years ===
Booth was born in Bradford, West Yorkshire, England, and grew up in Boston Spa, West Yorkshire in his teenage years. He attended Shrewsbury School. Whilst a student at the University of Manchester studying drama in 1981, Booth encountered Jim Glennie, Paul Gilbertson and Gavan Whelan in the cellar bar of the university's students' union. Impressed by Booth's distinctive dancing style, Gilbertson invited Booth to join their band as a dancer. Booth accepted the offer, and was soon promoted to lead singer and lyricist of the band James.

=== 1990s ===
After a struggle for success and recognition through most of the 1980s, James finally achieved commercial success in the early 1990s with the rise of the Madchester music scene, and their single "Sit Down" reached number 2 in the UK Singles Chart.

During 1995, Booth took a break from James and recorded an album with film composer Angelo Badalamenti, entitled Booth and the Bad Angel. He then returned to James to complete the recording of the album Whiplash, and stayed with the band until 2001, when he announced his departure to concentrate on other projects.

=== 2000s ===
After leaving James, Booth spent time concentrating on teaching the dance practice known as the 5Rhythms, a movement meditation practice. In 2004, together with record producer Lee Muddy Baker and songwriter KK (Kevin Kerrigan), he released his first solo album, Bone, to general critical acclaim, though he referred to it as a collaborative effort and preferred to credit the album to 'Tim Booth & the Individuals' as opposed to taking sole credit. He also began taking acting lessons during this time, and starred in a production at Bolton's Octagon Theatre. He also appeared as the Batman villain Victor Zsasz in the 2005 film Batman Begins. Booth also voiced the character in the video game adaptation of the film.

On Good Friday, 14 April 2006, he appeared as Judas in the Manchester Passion – a musical style show in the middle of Manchester, using music from the region to tell the story of Easter. Booth sang a version of the Smiths's "Heaven Knows I'm Miserable Now", and although the James song "Sit Down" was used, it was not sung by Booth himself (he did, however, sing it in an encore after the cameras had stopped rolling).

Booth has also contributed to MTV's search for the greatest song lyrics in April 2006 as a critic.

In January 2007, it was announced that Booth would be rejoining James. The band played an eight date tour in April 2007 and made appearances at several music festivals throughout 2007. This was followed by a new James album, Hey Ma in April 2008 which coincided with a UK tour.

He has also stated that, despite the reunion of James, he still plans to release further solo material.

=== 2010s ===
In 2010, Booth continued his acting career with a role in the independent film Poor Wee Me, the debut feature from Salford film director Simon Powell, in which he played the role of Gabriel De Souza, the shady boss of a debt collection agency.

Booth released a new solo album, Love Life, in April 2011; again with Lee 'Muddy' Baker producing, co-writing and playing guitar. The release of the album was accompanied by a tour of the UK and then continental Europe, with Tim's backing band featuring Baker as well as Saul Davies, violinist with James.

== Discography ==
=== Albums ===
- Booth and the Bad Angel (1996) - as Booth and the Bad Angel
- Bone (2004)
- Love Life (2011)

== Sources ==
- Stuart Maconie: Folklore, Virgin Books, 2000 (ISBN 0-7535-0494-4).
