= CST =

CST, Cst, or cSt may refer to:

== Time zones ==
- Central Standard Time, North America: UTC−06:00
- China Standard Time: UTC+08:00
- Cuba Standard Time: UTC−04:00

== Government and politics ==
- Canada Social Transfer, an equalization payment
- Collective Security Treaty of the Commonwealth of Independent States
- Sandinista Workers' Centre (Spanish: Central Sandinista de Trabajadores), in Nicaragua
- Socialist Workers' Current (Portuguese: Corrente Socialista dos Trabalhadores), in Brazil

== Health and medicine ==
- Canadian Society of Transplantation
- Captopril suppression test
- Cavernous sinus thrombosis
- Cell Signaling Technology, a US company
- Certified sex therapist
- Certified surgical technologist
- Contraction stress test in obstetrics
- Craniosacral therapy
- Cystatin (CST)
- CST complex, a protein trimer

== Science and technology ==
- Cambridge Systems Technology, Former UK computing company
- Centistokes (cSt), a unit of kinematic viscosity
- Certification for Sustainable Transportation, University of Vermont, US
- Concept of Stratification
- Concrete syntax tree
- Common spanning tree, a networking concept used by the Multiple Spanning Tree Protocol
- Computer Simulation Technology, a maker of computational electromagnetics software
- Constant strain triangle element, in finite element analysis
- Council for Science and Technology of the UK government
- Cross-species transmission
- Concentrated solar thermal, another name for concentrated solar power

== Transportation ==
- Cargo Sous Terrain, a planned underground logistics system in Switzerland
- Stockholm Central Station (station code Cst)
- Chhatrapati Shivaji Terminus, Mumbai, India
- Coast Air of Norway (ICAO designator CST)
- Cannon Street station, London, England

== Other uses ==
- California Standards Test
- Catholic social teaching
- Center for Survivors of Torture, an American charity
- Cheng Shin Tire, Taiwan
- Chicago Shakespeare Theater
- Child sex tourism
- Church of Spiritual Technology, Scientology company
- Civil Support Team, US
- Claremont School of Theology, California, US
- Community Security Trust, a UK Jewish charity
- Compliance, Strategy, and Transactions, the framework within business operations related to regulations (compliance), long-term organizational plans (strategy), and financial deals and operational activities (transactions).
- Constable, abbreviated Cst. as a prenominal, Canadian.
- Cox Sports Television
- Czechoslovak Television (ČST)
- Congregation of Saint Thérèse of Lisieux

== See also ==
- Crew Space Transportation 100 (CST-100)
