= Jerry M. Mendel =

Engineer, academic, and author

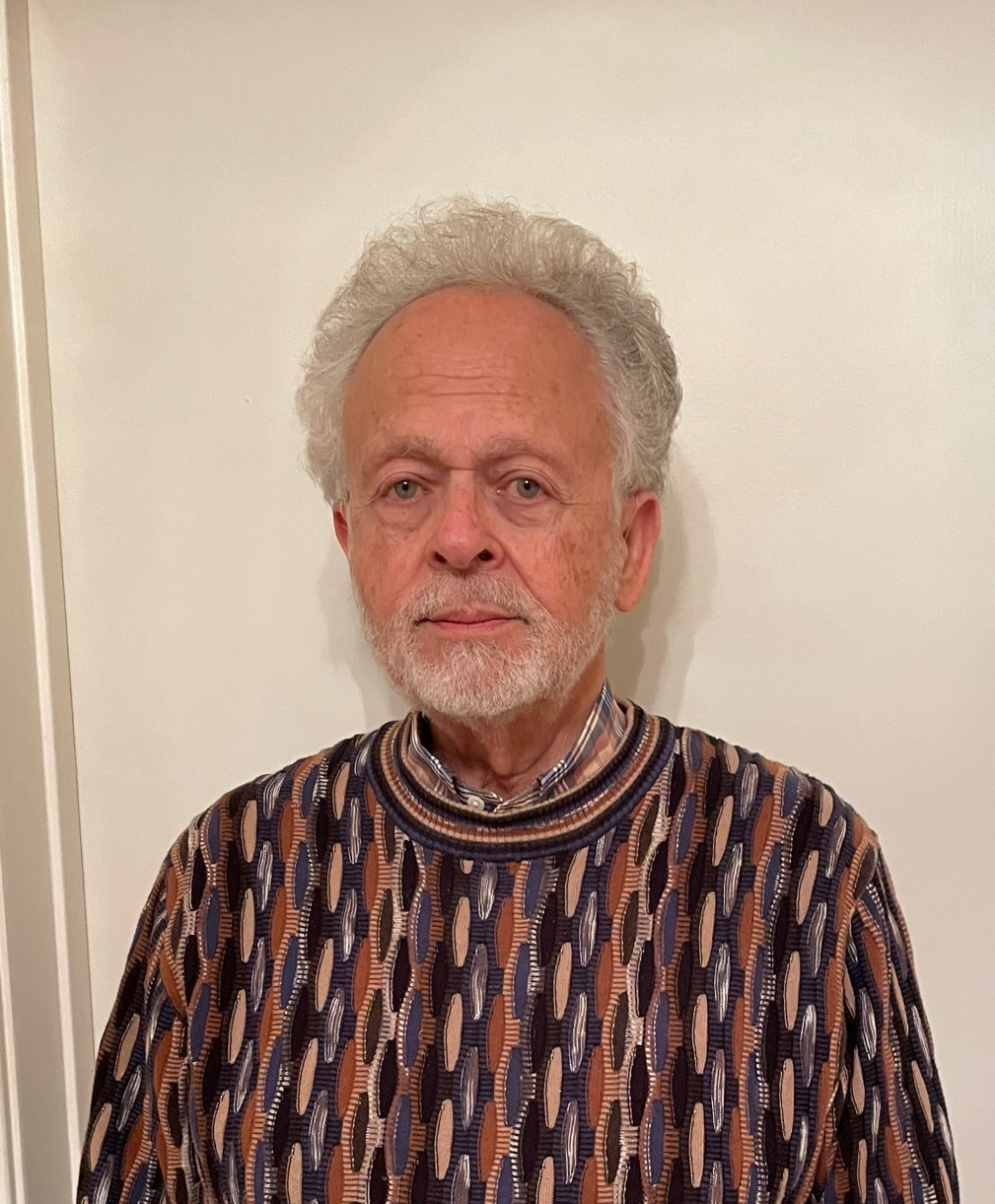
- Occupations: Engineer, academic and author

Academic background
- Education: BS., Mechanical Engineering; MS., Electrical Engineering; Ph.D., Electrical Engineering
- Alma mater: Polytechnic Institute of Brooklyn
- Website: jmmprof.com

Jerry M. Mendel is an engineer, academic, and author. He is professor emeritus of Electrical and Computer Engineering at the University of Southern California.

Mendel has authored and co-authored 600 technical papers and 13 books including Uncertain Rule-based Fuzzy Logic Systems: Introduction and New Directions, Explainable Uncertain Rule-Based Fuzzy Systems, Perceptual Computing: Aiding People in Making Subjective Judgments, and Introduction to Type-2 Fuzzy Logic Control: Theory and Application. He is the recipient of several awards, including the 1984 IEEE Centennial Medal, the IEEE Third Millennium Medal in 2000, IEEE Computational Intelligence Society's Fuzzy Systems Pioneer Award in 2008, the 2015 USC Viterbi School of Engineering Senior Research Award, and the IEEE Lotfi A. Zadeh Pioneer Award for developing and promoting type-2 fuzzy logic in 2021.

Mendel is a Life Fellow of the IEEE, a Distinguished Member of the IEEE Control Systems Society, a Fellow of the International Fuzzy Systems Association, the Asia-Pacific AI Association, and an elected member of Sigma Xi.

== Education ==
Mendel obtained a Bachelor of Science in Mechanical Engineering in 1959, a Master of Science in Electrical Engineering in 1960, and a Doctor of Philosophy in Electrical Engineering in 1963, all from the Polytechnic Institute of Brooklyn.

== Career ==
In 1963, Mendel began work at Douglas Aircraft (which later became McDonnell Douglas). He joined the University of Southern California as a Visiting Associate Professor of Electrical Engineering in 1974, later becoming a Research Associate Professor in 1976, then a Research Professor and finally, Professor in 1980. He remained at USC for 44 years during which he and his students researched model-based signal processing for exploration seismology, higher-order statistics for non-Gaussian data processing, petroleum reservoir signal processing with fuzzy logic and extended Kalman filtering, type-1 and type-2 fuzzy logic systems, perceptual computing for assisting people in making subjective judgments, computing with words, and fuzzy set qualitative comparative analysis. In 2018, he was given the title of emeritus Professor of Electrical Engineering by the University of Southern California.

Mendel served as the President of the IEEE Control Systems Society in 1986, and for nine years, he held a position on the Administrative Committee of the IEEE Computational Intelligence Society, where he chaired both the Fuzzy Systems Technical Committee and the Computing With Words Task Force within that committee.

== Research ==
During his academic career, Mendel contributed to the field of engineering through his research and publications, which in his early years in academia, focused on model-based signal processing, mainly deconvolution of seismic petroleum exploration data; in his middle years in academia they focused on higher-order statistical signal processing; and, in his mid-to-later years in academia they focused on fuzzy systems, particularly type-2 fuzzy systems, as well as computing with words, and explainable artificial intelligence for rule-based fuzzy systems. He and his students pioneered the advancement of type-2 fuzzy logic, which enables the direct modeling of a wide spectrum of uncertainties, and is beyond the scope of traditional (type-1) fuzzy logic. Additionally, he investigated and quantified the factors contributing to the superior performance of type-1 fuzzy systems compared to non-fuzzy systems, interval type-2 fuzzy systems compared to type-1 fuzzy systems, and general type-2 fuzzy systems compared to interval type-2 fuzzy systems, and, how to explain the outputs of a rule-based fuzzy system.

== Works ==
Mendel has authored or co-authored 13 books. In the 1995 textbook Lessons in Estimation Theory for Signal Processing, Communications, and Control, he provided a one semester graduate course about the field of estimation theory and estimation algorithms. J.J. Shynk commented, "Graduate students and researchers in electrical engineering will find the book to be an excellent resource, both as an introduction to the basic concepts in estimation and as a reference text." His highly referenced 1995 tutorial about type-1 fuzzy logic systems makes such systems readily accessible to engineers and computer scientists.

In the 2001 textbook Uncertain Rule-based Fuzzy Logic Systems: Introduction and New Directions, Mendel presented the details and methodologies of type-1 and type-2 fuzzy set theory for rule-based fuzzy systems, and demonstrated how type-2 fuzzy logic can overcome the limitations of classical (type-1) fuzzy logic. A second edition of this book was published in 2017, and a third edition in 2024, with the title Explainable Uncertain Rule-Based Fuzzy Systems. In their review of the first edition, published in the IEEE Computational Intelligence Magazine, academics Woei Wan Tan and Teck Wee Chua remarked, "... this is an outstanding book that is highly recommended for graduate students, practitioners and researchers working in the general area of computational intelligence."

Mendel further explored the domain of type-2 fuzzy logic control in the 2014 co-authored book Introduction to Type-2 Fuzzy Logic Control: Theory and Application, which was an introductory book providing theoretical, practical, and application coverage of type-2 fuzzy logic control. In 2010, he co-authored the book Perceptual Computing: Aiding People in Making Subjective Judgments, that explained for the first time how computing with words and type-2 fuzzy sets can aid in making subjective judgments. In his review, John Terry Rickard wrote, "I highly recommend this book to anyone having an interest in computational intelligence using fuzzy systems."

=== Fuzzy logic systems ===
Mendel studied fuzzy logic systems throughout his career, beginning with type-1 fuzzy sets and systems and then type-2 fuzzy sets and systems. In 1992, he collaborated with Li-Xin Wang to create the Wang-Mendel (WM) method for extracting fuzzy rules from numerical data, thereby creating a combined fuzzy rule base capable of approximating continuous functions with high accuracy in a compact set, and demonstrated its applicability in various domains. He further collaborated with Li-Xin Wang to demonstrate that the output of a type-1 fuzzy system could be expressed as a linear combination of so-called fuzzy basis functions, and that such a system could uniformly approximate any real continuous function on a compact set, making it a nonlinear universal function approximator. In 1997, he co-developed non-singleton fuzzy systems with George Mouzouris, which allowed noisy data to be handled very effectively by a fuzzy system.

In 1999, Mendel and his students Nilesh Karnik and Qilian Liang introduced type-2 fuzzy logic systems and demonstrated that they outperform type-1 fuzzy logic systems and nearest neighbor classifiers, offering improved performance in handling uncertainties. Their 1999 article received the 2002 IEEE Transactions on Fuzzy Systems Outstanding Paper Award.

Mendel is the inventor or co-inventor of multiple novel items about type-2 fuzzy sets and systems, including: wavy-slice mathematical representation of a type-2 fuzzy set, the entire theories of general type-2 fuzzy logic systems and interval type-2 fuzzy logic systems, type-reduction, which maps a type-2 fuzzy set into a type-1 fuzzy set, something that is needed in order to obtain the numerical output of such a system, centroid of a type-2 fuzzy set, Karnik-Mendel (KM) and enhanced KM algorithms, and first and second-order rule partition theory that help distinguish fuzzy systems and suggest that the greater sculpting of the state space by interval type-2 fuzzy systems can lead to better performance, and that general type-2 fuzzy systems have the potential to outperform interval type-2 fuzzy systems due to maximum changes occurring in second-order rule partitions.

In a 2020 article summarizing contributions to the field of type-2 fuzzy sets and systems, it was found that among the 20 most highly cited papers, Mendel and his students have the highest number and citations in the field, with him being the sole or co-author of 12 of these papers, including the most highly cited one.

=== Computing with words ===
Mendel introduced an architecture called the Perceptual Computer (Per-C) for computing with words that uses type-2 fuzzy sets to handle the linguistic uncertainties that are associated with word meanings; it enables human-computer interactions through words. One of the main components of the Per-C is a coding block in which words are modeled using data that are easily collected either from a group of subjects or, if the Per-C is used as a personal advisor, from a single subject. He and his students (Feilong Liu, Dongrui Wu and Minshen Hao) developed three methods for doing this. The Per-C can be used to assist people in making subjective judgments, such as financial, medical, societal and security decisions. More than 10 years of work on the Per-C are explained in his co-authored monograph Perceptual Computing: Aiding People in Making Subjective Judgments.

=== Explainable artificial intelligence ===
Mendel has also co-explored with Piero Bonnissone, the concept of explainable artificial intelligence (XAI) in the context of rule-based fuzzy systems, emphasizing the limitations of explaining outputs using traditional IF-THEN rules and proposing a novel approach to generate concise explanations by identifying a small subset of rules associated with specific linguistic antecedents. Additionally, he highlighted (with Dongrui Wu) the effectiveness of a linguistic summarization approach using IF-THEN rules, and introduced quality measures to identify reliable and exceptional rules and data for enhanced data understanding and predictive reasoning.

=== Deconvolution ===
Mendel investigated a problem in seismic data processing, called deconvolution, related to petroleum exploration. He developed a Kalman filtering approach for obtaining optimal smoothed estimates of the reflection coefficient sequence, which holds crucial information about subsurface geometry. He also, co-studied (with Li-Xin Wang) the use of artificial neural networks, specifically Hopfield neural networks, to accelerate seismic signal processing tasks, particularly minimum prediction-error deconvolution, and wavelet estimation, and proved the approach to be highly efficient. In a co-authored article, with John Kormulo, that received the IEEE Geoscience and Remote Sensing Society Best Transactions Paper Award in 1983, he further addressed a range of seismic deconvolution problems using a maximum-likelihood (seismic) deconvolution (MLD) approach, which involves utilizing state-variable technology (smoothing), maximum-likelihood estimation, and a sparse spike train model to detect reflectors.

=== Higher-order statistics ===
Mendel and his students developed signal processing methods that used higher-order statistics for coping with non-Gaussianity, including identification of non-minimum phase systems, parameter estimation for AR, ARMA and MA models, harmonic retrieval and array processing. His co-authored article, with Georgios Giannakis, about identifying non-minimum phase systems, received the IEEE Signal Processing Society 1992 Paper Award.

== Awards and honors ==
- 2004 – Life Fellow, IEEE
- 2008 – Fuzzy Systems Pioneer Award, IEEE Computational Intelligence Society
- 2009 – Fellow, International Fuzzy Systems Association
- 2021 – Lotfi A. Zadeh Pioneer Award, IEEE

== Bibliography ==
=== Selected books ===
- Maximum-Likelihood Deconvolution: A Journey into Model-Based Signal Processing (1990) ISBN 0-387-97208-0
- Lessons in Estimation Theory for Signal Processing, Communications, and Control (1995) ISBN 9780131209817
- Introduction to Rule-Based Fuzzy Logic Systems (2001) ISBN 9780130409690
- Perceptual Computing: Aiding People in Making Subjective Judgments (2010) ISBN 9780470478769
- Introduction to Type-2 Fuzzy Logic Control: Theory and Application (2014) ISBN 9781118278390
- Uncertain Rule-based Fuzzy Logic Systems: Introduction and New Directions (2017) ISBN 9783319513690

=== Selected articles ===
- Kormylo, J. & J. M. Mendel (1983). Maximum-likelihood seismic deconvolution. IEEE Transactions on Geoscience and Remote Sensing, 21 (1), 72–82.
- Giannakis, G. B. & J. M. Mendel (1989). Identification of non-minimum phase systems using higher-order statistics. IEEE Transactions on Acoustics, Speech and Signal Processing. 37 (3), 360–377.
- Mendel, J. M. (1991). Tutorial on higher-order statistics (spectra) in signal processing and system theory: Theoretical results and some applications. Proceedings of the IEEE, 79 (3), 278–305.
- Wang, L. X., & Mendel, J. M. (1992). Generating fuzzy rules by learning from examples. IEEE Transactions on Systems, Man, and Cybernetics, 22 (6), 1414–1427.
- Wang, L. X., & Mendel, J. M. (1992). Fuzzy basis functions, universal approximation, and orthogonal least-squares learning. IEEE Transactions on Neural Networks, 3 (5), 807–814.
- Mendel, J. M. (1995). Fuzzy logic systems for engineering: a tutorial. Proceedings of the IEEE, 83 (3), 345–377.
- Karnik, N. N., J. M. Mendel & Q. Liang (1999). Type-2 fuzzy logic systems. IEEE Transactions on Fuzzy Systems, 7 (6), 643–658.
- Liang, Q. & J. M. Mendel (2000). Interval type-2 fuzzy logic systems: Theory and design. IEEE Transactions on fuzzy systems, 8 (5), 535–550.
- Mendel, J. M., & John, R. B. (2002). Type-2 fuzzy sets made simple. IEEE Transactions on Fuzzy Systems, 10 (2), 117–127.
- Mendel, J. M. (2002). An architecture for making judgments using computing with words. International Journal of Applied Mathematical Computer Science, 12 (3), 325–335.
- Mendel, J. M., John, R. I., & Liu, F. (2006). Interval type-2 fuzzy logic systems made simple. IEEE Transactions on Fuzzy Systems, 14 (6), 808–821.
- Wu, D. and J. M. Mendel (2011). On the continuity of type-1 and interval type-2 fuzzy logic systems. IEEE Transactions on Fuzzy Systems, 19 (1), 179–192.
- Mendel, J. M. (2018). Comparing the performance potentials of interval and general type-2 rule-based fuzzy systems in terms of sculpting the state space. IEEE Transactions on Fuzzy Systems, 27 (1), 58–71.
- Mendel, J. M., & Bonissone, P. P. (2021). Critical thinking about explainable AI (XAI) for rule-based fuzzy systems. IEEE Transactions on Fuzzy Systems, 29 (12), 3579–3593.
