= International Day in Support of Victims of Torture =

International observance

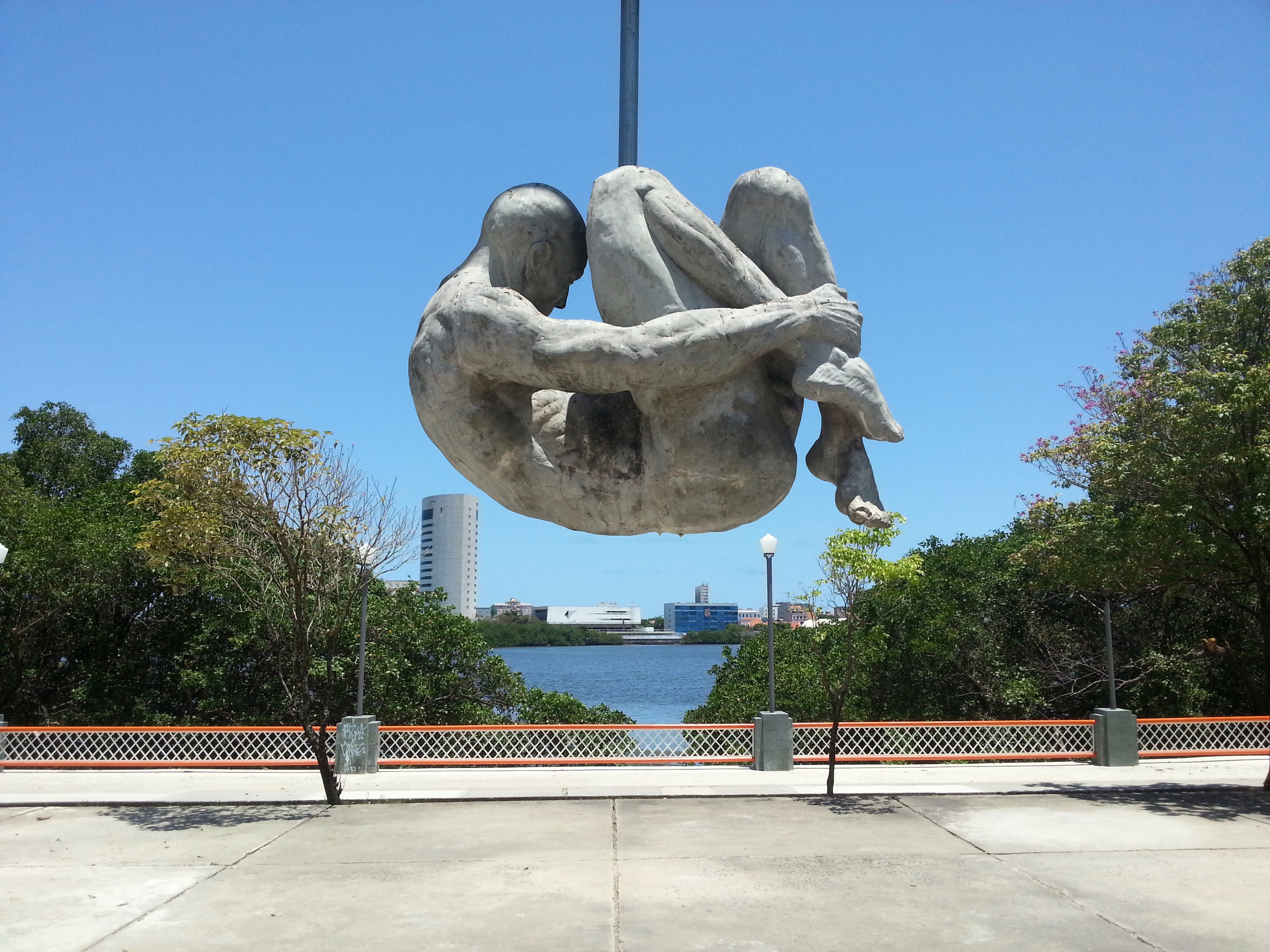
- "Torture Never Again" Monument
- Also called: 26 June
- Type: International
- Date: 26 June
- Next time: 26 June 2027
- Frequency: annual
- Related to: Human Rights Day

The United Nations International Day in Support of Victims of Torture is an international observance held annually on 26 June to speak out against the crime of torture and to honor and support victims and survivors throughout the world. The first 26 June events were launched in 1998.

== History ==
The first 26 June events were launched in 1998. The day was selected by the United Nations General Assembly for two reasons. First, on 26 June 1945, the United Nations Charter was signed during the midst of World War II – the first international instrument obliging UN members to respect and promote human rights. Second, 26 June 1987 was when the United Nations Convention against Torture and Other Cruel, Inhuman or Degrading Treatment or Punishment came into effect.

The decision to annually observe the International Day in Support of Victims of Torture was taken by the UN General Assembly at the proposal of Denmark, which is home to the world-renowned International Rehabilitation Council for Torture Victims (IRCT).

This is a day on which we pay our respects to those who have endured the unimaginable. This is an occasion for the world to speak up against the unspeakable. It is long overdue that a day be dedicated to remembering and supporting the many victims and survivors of torture around the world.

— Former United Nations Secretary-General Kofi Annan, 1998

Since then, nearly 100 organizations in dozens of countries all over the world mark the day each year with events, celebrations and campaigns.

On 16 July 2009, the International Day in Support of Victims of Torture was chosen as a public holiday in Bosnia and Herzegovina.

== Past observances ==
On this International Day in Support of Victims of Torture, we express our solidarity with, and support for, the hundreds of thousands of victims of torture and their family members throughout the world who endure such suffering. We also note the obligation of States not only to prevent torture but to provide all torture victims with effective and prompt redress, compensation and appropriate social, psychological, medical and other forms of rehabilitation. Both the General Assembly and the Human Rights Council have now strongly urged States to establish and support rehabilitation centers or facilities.

— United Nations Secretary-General Ban Ki-moon, 2012

Year	Theme
2015	Right To Rehabilitation (R2R)
2025	“Torture: a crime against humanity,”

== Global campaign ==
Every year the IRCT monitors the campaign plans of organizations around the world and towards the end of the year publishes the 26 June Global Report where it describes the events held in commemoration of the day. According to the latest 26 June Global Report (2012), at least 100 organizations in 60 countries around the world commemorated the day with conferences, workshops, peaceful rallies, cultural and musical events, events for children, etc.

List of organizations reported to have held events to commemorate the day in 2012:

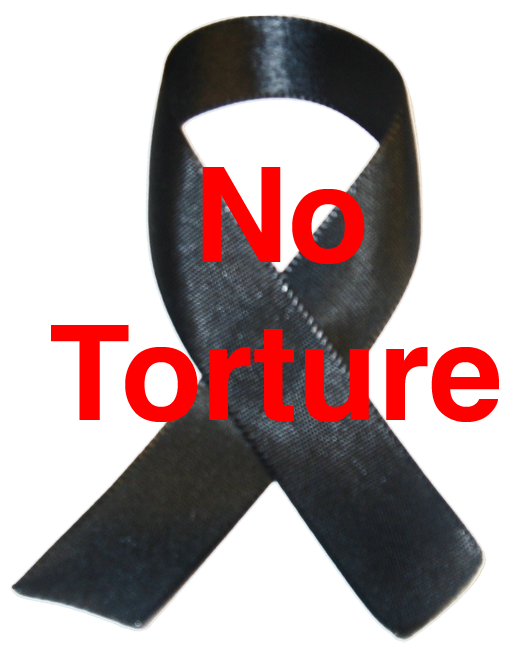

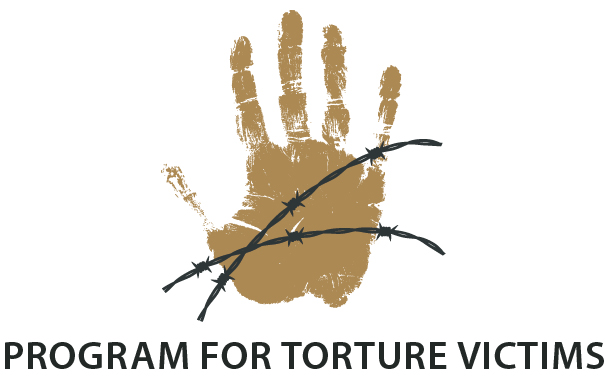

Albania: Albanian Rehabilitation Centre for Trauma and Torture (ARCT)
Argentina: Equipo Argentino de Trabajo e Investigación Psicosocial (EATIP)
Armenia: Civil Society Institute (CSI), Foundation Against Violation of Law (FAVL)
Australia: Phoenix Centre; Service for the Treatment and Rehabilitation of Torture Survivors (STARTTS); and Survivors of Torture and Trauma Assistance and Rehabilitation Service (STTARS)
Bangladesh: Centre for Rehabilitation of Torture Survivors (CRTS); Bangladesh Centre for Human Rights and Development (BCHRD); and Bangladesh Human Rights Commission (BHRC)
Bolivia: Instituto de Terapia E Investigación Sobre las Secuelas de la Tortura y la Violencia Estatal (ITEI)
Bosnia and Herzegovina: Vive Žene Centre for Therapy and Rehabilitation
Brazil: Grupo Tortura Nunca Mais / Rio de Janeiro
Burundi: Solidarité d'Actions pour la Paix / Grand Lacs
Cameroon: Trauma Centre Cameroon
Cambodia: Transcultural Psychosocial Organization
Canada: Canadian Centre for International Justice (CCIJ)
Chad: Association Jeunesse pour la Paix et la Non Violence / Centre de Réhabilitation des Victimes de la Torture (AJPNV/CRVT)
Colombia: Corporación Centro de Atención Psicosocial (CAPS-CO)
Croatia: Rehabilitation Centre for Torture Victims (RCT) Zagreb
Democratic Republic of the Congo: OASIS Centre for Treatment and Rehabilitation of Victims of Torture and Trauma (OASIS); Committee of Observers of Human Rights (CODHO); GIPROCOME; Regroupement des Mamans de Kamituga (REMAK); SOS Jeunesse et Enfance en Detresse (SOS JED); Centre Psycho Médical pour la Réhabilitation des Victimes de la Torture / Solidarité Pour la Promotion Sociale et la Paix (CPMRVT/SOPROP); SAVE CONGO; Amis des Victimes des Violations des Droits Humains (AVVDH)
Egypt: El Nadeem Center for Psychological Management and Rehabilitation of Victims of Violence
El Salvador: Salvadoran Association of Torture Survivors (ASST)
Finland: Centre for Survivors of Torture in Finland (CSTF)
France: Action by Christians for the Abolition of Torture (ACAT)
Georgia: EMPATHY, Psycho-Rehabilitation Centre for Victims of Torture, Violence and Pronounced Stress Impact (RCT/EMPATHY); Georgian Centre for Psychosocial and Medical Rehabilitation of Torture Victims (GCRT)
Germany: Berlin Treatment Center for Torture Victims (bzfo); Medical Care Service for Refugees Bochum (MFH Bochum)
Hong Kong: Asian Human Rights Commission (AHRC)
Hungary: Cordelia Foundation for the Rehabilitation of Torture Victims
India: Centre for Care of Torture Victims (CCTV); Centre for Organisation, Research and Education / Human to Humane Transcultural Centre for Trauma and Torture (CORE/H2H); South India Cell for Human Rights Education and Monitoring (SICHREM); Tibetan Torture Survivors' Program (TTSP)
Indonesia: Alliance of Democracy for Papua (ALDP); Alliance of Civil Society for Anti-Torture (SIKAP); and Rehabilitation Action for Torture Victims in Aceh (RATA)
Iran: Organization for Defending Victims of Violence (ODVV)
Iraq: Bahjat Al-Fuad Rehabilitation of Medical & Psychological Centre for Torture Victims (BFRCT)
Ireland: SPIRASI, The Centre for the Care of Survivors of Torture (CCST)
Israel: Public Committee Against Torture in Israel (PCATI)
Kenya: Mwatikho Torture Survivors Organization (MATESO); Independent Medico-Legal Unit (IMLU); Center for Victims of Torture (CVT-Kenya); Centre Against Torture (CAT-Kenya); International Rescue Committee at Hagadera Refugee Camp (IRC-Hagadera)
Kosovo: Kosovo Rehabilitation Centre for Torture Victims (KRCT)
Kyrgyzstan: GOLOS SVOBODY Public Foundation
Lebanon: Khiam Rehabilitation Center for Victims of Torture (KRC)
Liberia: Liberia Association of Psychosocial Services (LAPS)
Mexico: Colectivo Contra la Tortura y la Impunidad (CCTI)
Moldova: Rehabilitation Centre for Torture Victims – "Memoria"
Morocco: Association Medicale de Réhabilitation des Victimes de la Torture (AMRVT)
Namibia: People's Education Assistance and Counselling for Empowerment (PEACE)
Nepal: Centre for Victims of Torture Nepal (CVICT)
New Zealand: Refugee Trauma Recovery (RTR)
Nigeria: Youth Education on Human Rights and Civil Responsibility (YEHRCR); Prisoners Rehabilitation and Welfare Action (PRAWA)
Pakistan: Human Development Organization (HDO); SACH Struggle for Change
Palestinian Territory: Treatment and Rehabilitation Center for Victims of Torture (TRC)
Philippines: Asian Medical Students Association – Philippines (AMSA-Philippines); Balay Rehabilitation Center; Medical Action Group (MAG)
Russia: Interregional Nongovernmental Organization Committee Against Torture (INGOCAT)
Senegal: Victimes de Violences Rehabilitées, le Centre de Soins du CAPREC (VIVRE/CAPREC)
Serbia: International Aid Network Centre for Rehabilitation of Torture Victims (IAN CRTV)
Spain: Coordinadora para la Prevención y denuncia de la Tortura (CPDT)
South Africa: Centre for the Study of Violence and Reconciliation/Programme: Trauma and Transition Programme (CSVR/TTP); and The Trauma Centre for Survivors of Violence and Torture (TCSVT)
Sierra Leone: Community Association for Psychosocial Services (CAPS)
South Africa: The Trauma Centre For Survivors of Violence and Torture (TCSVT)
Sri Lanka: Survivors Associated (SA); Family Rehabilitation Centre (FRC); Human Rights Office – Kandy
Sweden: Red Cross – Stockholm; Red Cross – Malmö
Switzerland: World Organisation Against Torture (OMCT)
Togo: Collective of Associations Against Impunity in Togo (CACIT)
Turkey: Centre of Social Action, Rehabilitation and Readjustment for the victims of torture (SOHRAM-CASRA); Foundation for Social and Legal Studies (TOHAV)
Uganda: African Centre for Treatment and Rehabilitation of Torture Victims (ACTV)
United Kingdom: London Guantanamo Campaign (LGC); Freedom From Torture; Refugee Therapy Centre (RTC); Zimbabwe Human Rights NGO Forum and Redress
United States: Survivors of Torture, International; Bellevue/NYU Program for Survivors of Torture; Center for Survivors of Torture, San Jose; Center for Survivors of Torture and War Trauma (CSTWT); Florida Center for Survivors of Torture – A Program of Gulf Coast Jewish Family Services, Inc. (FCST); Program for Survivors of Torture and Severe Trauma at the Center for Multicultural Human Services (a program of NVFS); Center for Victims of Torture (CVT); Center for Survivors of Torture, Dallas; National Religious Campaign Against Torture (NRCAT)
Venezuela: Red de Apoyo por la Justicia y la Paz

In Asia the Asian Human Rights Commission holds regional events every year. Anti-torture networks in various Asian countries that still suffer from the widespread use of torture hold rallies and public events.

== See also ==
- International Rehabilitation Council for Torture Victims
