= Johnny Yen =

Johnny Yen may refer to:

- Yen Hsing-su (born 1976), Taiwanese basketball player, singer, actor
- "Johnny Yen", a song from Stutter (album) by James
- The main character of the Iggy Pop song Lust for Life

== See also ==
- John Yen, Taiwanese-American researcher of artificial intelligence
