= Chain mail (disambiguation) =

Chain mail or Chainmail is a type of armour made by knitting metal rings together.

Chain mail, Chainmail, or Chain Mail may also refer to:

- Chain mail, or chain letters, messages sent from person to person that form a 'chain'
- Chainmail (game), a wargame which was the precursor to Dungeons & Dragons
- Chain Mail, novel by Diane Carey 2001
- Chain Mail (film), a 2015 Filipino mystery horror film
- "Chainmail", song by Curve from album Gift (Curve album)
- "Chain Mail" (song) by James

== See also ==
- Chain letter (disambiguation)
