= Fei-Yue Wang =

Chinese engineer

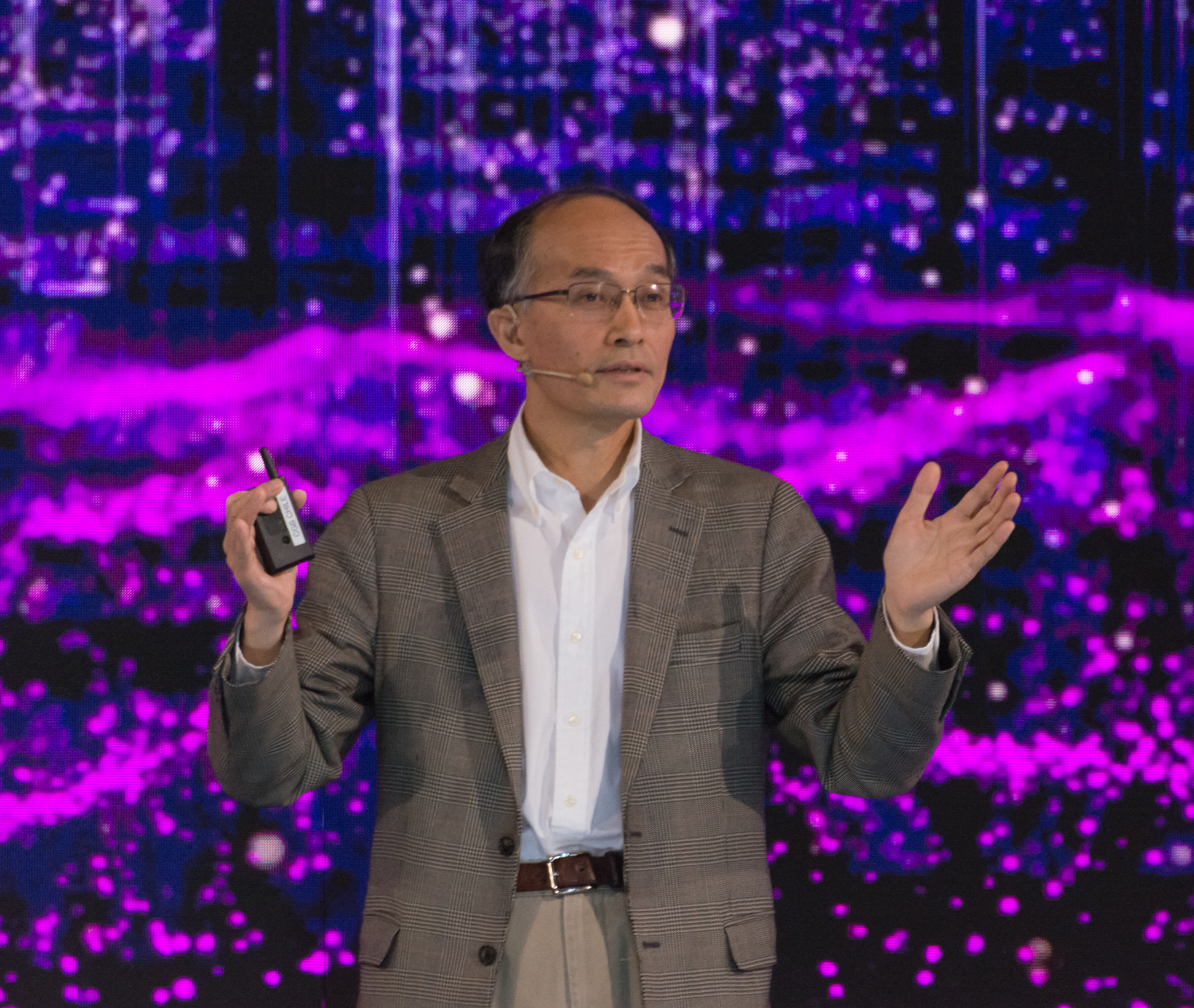
- Born: November 1961 (age 64–65); Qingdao, Shandong Province, China
- Citizenship: People's Republic of China
- Education: Rensselaer Polytechnic Institute, US (Ph.D. 1990); Zhejiang University, China; Qingdao University of Science and Technology, China
- Known for: Social computing, knowledge automation, parallel management, parallel intelligence
- Awards: National Natural Science Award of China (2007); Fellow of IEEE (2003, expelled in 2026), INCOSE, IFAC, AAAS (2007) and ASME (2007); ACM Distinguished Member (2007); IEEE Intelligent Transportation Systems Society Outstanding Intelligent Transportation Systems Research Award (2011); ASME MESA Achievement Award (2012); IEEE SMC Norbert Wiener Award (2014); IEEE TNNLS Outstanding Paper Award (2016), IEEE Transportation Technologies Award (2025)
- Scientific career
- Fields: Intelligent control, social computing, parallel intelligence, parallel management and control, knowledge automation
- Workplaces: Institute of Automation of the Chinese Academy of Sciences, Beijing, China; Qingdao Academy of Intelligent Industries
- Doctoral advisor: George N. Saridis, Robert F. McNaughton (minor in Computer Science)

Fei-Yue Wang (Chinese: 王飞跃; born November 1961) is a professor of the University of the Chinese Academy of Sciences, a specially appointed state expert, and the Chief Scientist and Founding Director of the State Key Laboratory for Management and Control of Complex Systems of the Chinese Academy of Sciences in Beijing, China, where he has worked since 1999. He also has several other academic affiliations with other institutions. Previously he was a Professor of Systems and Industrial Engineering at the University of Arizona and was its Director of the Robotics and Automation Laboratory and its Program in Advanced Research for Complex Systems (joining in 1990, rising to full professor in 1999, continuing until 2011).

He was the president of the IEEE Intelligent Transportation Systems Society from 2005 to 2007, the IEEE Council on RFID from 2019 to 2021, the Chinese Association for Science and Technology USA in 2005, and the American Zhu Kezhen Education Foundation from 2007 to 2008.

He has been the editor-in-chief of several scholarly journals and has received various awards and recognitions from academic and professional societies. He is a highly cited author of scholarly research, recorded in Google Scholar as having more than 130,000 citations to his published works, an h-index over 150, and an i10-index over 1,800.

In June 2026, as a sanction for unspecified misconduct, Fei-Yue Wang was expelled from membership in the Institute of Electrical and Electronics Engineers (IEEE). He was permanently banned from any type of membership in any part of IEEE and from all participation in activities of IEEE.

== Editorships ==
- Wang is a former editor-in-chief of the IEEE Transactions on Computational Social Systems (2017–2020).
- He is a former editor-in-chief of the IEEE/CAA Journal of Automatica Sinica (2014–2017).
- He is a former editor-in-chief of IEEE Transactions on Intelligent Transportation Systems (2009–2015).
- He is a former editor-in-chief of IEEE Intelligent Systems (2009–2012).
- He is a former associate editor of IEEE Transactions on Systems, Man, and Cybernetics (2001 – c. 2017)

== Awards and recognitions ==
- In 2003, Wang became a Fellow of the IEEE "for contributions to intelligent control systems and applications to complex systems".
- In 2007, he became a Fellow of the American Association for the Advancement of Science (AAAS).
- In 2007, he became a Fellow of the American Society of Mechanical Engineers (ASME).
- In 2007, he became a Distinguished Member of the Association for Computing Machinery (ACM).
- In 2011, he received the Outstanding Research Award of the IEEE Intelligent Transportation Systems Society.
- In 2012, he received the ASME Mechatronic and Embedded Systems and Applications (MESA) Achievement Award.
- In 2014, he received the Norbert Wiener Award of the IEEE Systems, Man, and Cybernetics Society (SMC) "for fundamental contributions to and innovations in the theory and application of intelligent control and management to complex systems".
- In 2016, he received the IEEE Transactions on Neural Networks and Learning Systems (TNNLS) Outstanding Paper Award.
- In 2024, he received the Emily Sopensky Meritorious Service Award of the IEEE Council on RFID.
- In 2025, he received the IEEE Transportation Technologies Award "for contributions to intelligent control and management of complex transportation systems".
