= Stutter (album) =

Studio album by James
- Released: 28 July 1986
- Recorded: January–March 1986
- Studios: Amazon, Liverpool
- Genre: Folk rock
- Length: 39:51
- Labels: Sire, Blanco y Negro
- Producer: Lenny Kaye

James chronology
Village Fire (1985)	Stutter (1986)	Strip-mine (1988)

Singles from Stutter
- 1. "So Many Ways" Released: June 1986

Stutter is the debut studio album by English rock band James. Blanco y Negro and Sire Records released it on 28 July 1986. After going through multiple vocalists and guitarists, the band caught the attention of Factory Records. James released two EPs with the label; between them Larry Gott replaced guitarist Paul Gilbertson. The band supported the Smiths twice, before eventually signing with Sire. Between January and March 1986, the band recorded Stutter with Patti Smith live guitarist Lenny Kaye and engineer Gil Norton. Described as a folk rock album, the songs on Stutter tackle the topics of insects, reincarnation and being a tortured artist.

Stutter received generally positive reviews from music critics, some of whom commented on James' musicianship. It peaked at number 68 in the United Kingdom, to the annoyance of Sire. The album appeared on several publications' best-of-the-year album lists including The Face, NME, and Spex. "So Many Ways" was released as the lead single in June 1986 followed by an appearance at the WOMAD Festival. The band embarked on a brief tour of the UK and Europe. Stutter was reissued on CD twice, in 1991 and 2017; its tracks "So Many Ways" and "Johnny Yen" were included on the band's compilation album Fresh as a Daisy – The Singles (2007).

== Background ==
In 1980, guitarist Paul Gilbertson started a band when he convinced Jim Glennie to buy a bass. Vocalist Peter Carney left after they played their first show; a fortnight later drummer Gavan Whelan joined. The trio went through several vocalists and guitarists before the addition of frontwoman Jenny Ingham. They went through several name changes as well: Venereal and the Diseases, Volume Distortion, and Model Team International, before simplifying it to Model Team. In 1982, the band met Tim Booth while attending the University of Manchester. Booth joined initially as their dancer and then backing vocalist, before replacing Ingham outright. They used the name Tribal Outlook briefly before to settling on the moniker James. At Gilbertson's insistence, he and Glennie received lessons from Larry Gott.

James were making frequent appearances on the local club scene and supported New Order at The Haçienda club. James caught the attention of Tony Wilson of Factory Records who owned the venue; the band signed with the label. Feeling they were not ready to make an album, the band opted to record an EP instead. Factory released the resulting effort, the band's debut EP Jimone, in November 1983 even though James did not have a contract with the label. Glennie thought Factory worked inefficiently and did not trust them to release an album; Whelan said the label would pay to have a single made leaving no money to promote it.

After more shows, Gott became more involved in the band as Gilbertson withdrew. For most of 1984, James disappeared publicly for a few reasons. They wished to work on their song-writing. As well, Booth was struggling with liver disease, which had plagued him throughout his teenage years, and Gilbertson's erratic behaviour resulted in him not showing up for rehearsals and often disrupting their live shows. Morrissey of the Smiths praised James and asked the band to support them on tour. With Gott now an official member, the Smiths and James embarked on a short tour of Ireland near the end of the year. James released their second EP James II in February 1985, which was promoted with a 48-date tour, again supporting the Smiths.

James performed on national TV. Gott estimated half the audience consisted of A&R people from major labels. Following this, Martine McDonagh, Factory's press officer, advised them she had become the band's manager, and that they were leaving the label. A&M, Elektra and MCA Records all expressed interest in the band, who turned them all down. Through Geoff Travis of Rough Trade Records, the band learned that Seymour Stein of Sire was interested in signing them. He co-founded the label and had signed Talking Heads, the Undertones, and Madonna previously. Wishing to have their songs reach a wider audience, the band signed a two-album deal with Sire and Blanco y Negro Records in November 1985.

== Production ==
Stein asked the band who they wanted to produce their upcoming debut album. The band showed him a list that included Brian Eno, Patti Smith and Smith's live guitarist Lenny Kaye. Seeing his name, Stein told the band he was a friend of Kaye's, having met him following the release of Smith's "Piss Factory" (1974). Booth was enthralled with Kaye after hearing him playing on several albums as his career developed, and learned Kaye had begun moving into production. Initially, Kaye was hesitant about working with the band, proposing he would do their second album instead, so that they would be familiar with the recording process. After reassurances from Booth, Kaye flew from his residence in Upstate New York to the UK to start recording. The band met Kaye at Crescent Studios in Bath to record "Chain Mail", which was released single in January 1986. Stutter was produced by Kaye, and engineered by Gil Norton, at Amazon Studios in Liverpool between January and March 1986. The band lived in a house in Runcorn, which was run by the parents of one of the studio's staff members.

As Sire had given them a small budget for the sessions, to save as much money as they could, band members took to cycling between the house and the studio. The band spent some of the money buying equipment they lacked. Throughout the sessions, arguments broke out between the band and Kaye, often because they wanted to record the songs live as a full-band. Whelan sympathised with Kaye and Norton and said that Booth would not allow any effects to be used on his vocal takes. Many of the takes ended abruptly because of an out-of-tune instrument or a wrong note being played. The live set up annoyed Kaye because there was a lot of bleeding between microphones, such as the drum mics capturing a guitar sound. Booth and Whelan also argued, and Booth, Glennie and McDonagh exacerbated the situation by disappearing for hours at a time to meditate. Because of constant singing, Booth's voice suffered towards the end of the process and was strained and out of key. Gott said they were unable to bring out the potential in some songs, highlighting "Johnny Yen", as Kaye and Sire were too focused on "So Many Ways" sounding like a hit single. Both Gott and Whelan felt "Johnny Yen" could have single potential had they been able to dedicate more time to it.

== Composition ==
Musically, Stutter's has been described as folk rock. James initially wanted to title the album Lost Innocence, before deciding on Stutter. In retrospect, Glennie said the band were making the songs sound "needlessly complex", which he attributed to working on them for a long time. The album's opening track, "Skullduggery", talks about insects eating peoples' brains. Its subtext dealt with possession; Booth explained he was adamant that he would "go mad before [I turn] thirty". Booth wrote "Scarecrow", a song with a 6/8 time signature, in 1983, having been inspired by Patti Smith; it includes a reference to the biblical figure Joshua. "Johnny Yen" is a satirical jab at the concepts of outsider music and being a tortured artist. The band had a different song with a similar lyrical theme, which was improvised live despite being unfinished; "Johnny Yen" was inspired by having seen Iggy Pop live. Booth wrote the lyrics in the back of their touring van, with Whelan offering one or two lines.

"Summer Song" is about reincarnation and people who damage the planet for the sake of progress. It is followed by "Really Hard", which talks about being misunderstood. Booth referred to the former as one of their first "journey" tracks—songs that do not follow particular structures; they had worked on it over the course of a few years. Booth considered "Billy's Shirts" one of the band's "stranger experiments in song", inspired by "Rock Lobster" (1978) by the B-52's. "Why So Close" is a pseudo-protest track about the Cold War risk of nuclear annihilation. It is an acoustic remake of the Jimone track "Fire So Close" that placed an emphasis on Booth's lyrics and Whelan's piano playing, which contrasted with Jimone's version of a full-band punk sound. The closing track, "Black Hole", talks about the mind being one's worst enemy, and features some of Booth's earliest lyrics.

== Release ==
In June 1986, "So Many Ways" was released as a single, and featured "Withdrawn" and "Just Hipper" as extra tracks. Sire funded a music video for "So Many Ways", which saw the band standing in a field. In early July 1986, the band played a warm-up show before a performance at WOMAD Festival. Sire and Blanco y Negro Records released Stutter on 28 July 1986. The following month, the band embarked on a four-show tour in the UK. Except for some performances in mainland Europe, the band opted not to tour to support the album. The band were invited to support the Smiths on their tour of the United States; however, they pulled out four days before it started. Sire and Stein were annoyed by the album's lack of success, and with the band for not including a song on the album that Stein had heard them play live previously.

"Skullduggery" was sampled as part of a remix done by Andrew Weatherall of one of the band's later singles "Come Home" (1989). Stutter was released on CD for the first time in 1991, and again in 2017 as part of the Justhipper (The Complete Sire & Blanco Y Negro Recordings 1986 – 1988) compilation, with "Chain Mail", "Uprising", "Hup-Springs", and "Just Hipper" as bonus tracks. "So Many Ways" and "Johnny Yen" were included on the band's fourth compilation album Fresh as a Daisy – The Singles (2007). The music video for "So Many Ways" was included on the career-spanning box set The Gathering Sound (2012).

== Reception and legacy ==
Professional ratings
Review scores
Source	Rating
AllMusic	2.5/5 stars
Robert Christgau	B
Martin C. Strong	6/10
Q	2/5 stars
Record Mirror	4/5 stars
Smash Hits	9/10
Sounds	3/5 stars

Stutter was met with generally positive reviews from music critics. NME's Dave Haslam wrote that it was a "cleanly delivered debut LP, gleaming with creativity and confidence". He noted "such a tremendous livewire energy in the music that once again I'm left to rationalise a love with is instinctive, no less". Duncan Wright of Smash Hits said every track was a "polished nugget of fantasy and imagination full of mind-boggling details". Melody Maker writer Jim Shelley felt the album was "a safe, sensible James record". He complimented Kaye's "tidy production" for giving clarity to Booth's "eccentric existentialism". Music critic Robert Christgau saw the album as a "place pleasant, unkempt, and all their own, but not private enough to suit them--hence their wry, well-meaning, angst-ridden, and ultimately impenetrable lyrics".

In a review for Record Mirror, Eleanor Levy said that the album "shows just how difficult it is to transfer [the] spontaneity [of their earlier work] to vinyl". She added that it was a "mixed bag indeed. It's not the album it should have been — but it's close." AllMusic reviewer Dean Carlson called it "[t]hin, spiky, jagged folk music", and commented on the performances by the band: "Booth is a mere bystander to his wild vocals while the rest of the band watch ... Whelan have an absolute fit on — what sounds like — four drum kits at once. This is shoddy, shameless chaos. Nothing more than a terribly produced mess of tragic rock-star baiting and deliberate discordance. An amazing debut." Chris Roberts of Sounds considered it "such a slight disappointment." He added that it was "an interesting but club-footed student exercise".

Q reviewer Phil Sutcliffe said there was "a sense of echoey space around busy little instruments," with the production emphasises detail only to reveal ... Gott and ... Glennie in pedestrian form". The Guardian listed Stutter as one of the "1001 Albums to Hear Before You Die", praising the record thus: "Before Madchester, and before the Horlicks rock of "Sit Down" became ubiquitous, James were an invigorating prospect: a folk-pop band apparently engaged in a bout of pro-wrestling with their instruments. Their debut album clangs like a grand piano tumbling downstairs - leaving singalong melodies in its wake." Reviewing the Justhipper compilation, Frank Valish of Under the Radar said the album "acquits itself surprisingly well after 40 years. The guitar lines are sharp. The rhythms are engaging. The melodies are precise and not far off from those that would make James famous in the '90s."

Stutter reached number 68 on the UK Albums Chart.

== Track listing ==
All songs written by James.

Side one

1. "Skullduggery" – 2:43
2. "Scarecrow" – 3:00
3. "So Many Ways" – 3:46
4. "Just Hip" – 1:46
5. "Johnny Yen" – 3:41
6. "Summer Song" – 4:16

Side two

7. "Really Hard" – 4:13
8. "Billy's Shirts" – 3:27
9. "Why So Close" – 3:48
10. "Withdrawn" – 3:42
11. "Black Hole" – 5:29

== Personnel ==
Personnel per sleeve.

James

- Jim Glennie – bass
- Gavan Whelan – drums
- Tim Booth – vocals
- Larry Gott – guitar

Production and design

- Lenny Kaye – producer
- Gil Norton – engineer
- Jacqueline Ann Butler – painted photograph
- John Carroll – sleeve design

== Charts ==
Chart performance for Stutter
Chart (1986)	Peak position
UK Albums (Official Charts)	68
