= Petros A. Ioannou =

Cypriot American Electrical Engineer

- Born: Tripimeni, Cyprus
- Education: University College London B.S.; University of Illinois at Urbana–Champaign M.S. and Ph.D.
- Children: 3
- Scientific career
- Fields: Mathematics; Control theory; Adaptive control; Traffic flow
- Workplaces: University of Southern California
- Thesis: Robustness of Adaptive Schemes with Respect to Modeling Errors (1983)
- Doctoral advisor: Petar Kokotovic

Petros A. Ioannou is a Cypriot American Electrical Engineer who made important contributions in Robust Adaptive Control, Vehicle and Traffic Flow Control, and Intelligent Transportation Systems.

== Early life and education ==
Petros A. Ioannou was born in the village of Tripimeni in Cyprus. After graduation from the Technical School of Nicosia and completion of his compulsory military service he moved to London, England in 1973 to attend University College London. He graduated with First-class honours from University College London with a B.S. in mechanical engineering in 1978. He earned a M.S. in mechanical engineering and a Ph.D. in electrical engineering from the University of Illinois at Urbana–Champaign in the area of Robust Adaptive Control under the supervision of doctoral advisor Petar V. Kokotovic.

== Career ==
Ioannou became an assistant professor at the University of Southern California in 1982 and was subsequently promoted to associate and full professor. He is currently a full professor in the Department of Electrical and Computer Engineering at the University of Southern California where he holds courtesy appointments in the Departments of Aerospace and Mechanical Engineering and Industrial and Systems Engineering. He is the holder of the A.V. Balakrishnan Endowed Chair and in 2024 was given the title of University Professor which is one of the highest recognitions and honors at University of Southern California. He is the founder and director of the Center for Advanced Transportation Technologies and co-founder and associate director for research of the Metropolitan Transportation Center METRANS as well as the director of the Master Program on Financial Engineering. In 2024 he became the Director of the Center for Responsible AI in Decision Making in Finance (CREDIF). On February 9, 2022, he was elected as a member of the National Academy of Engineering (NAE) for his contributions to robust adaptive control and intelligent transportation systems for improved traffic flow and driver safety. In 2022, Ioannou was also elected to the Academia Europaea and to the National Academy of Inventors and in 2023 was elected Foreign Fellow of the European Academy of Science.

== Research ==
Ioannou’s multidisciplinary research focusses on solving problems related to automatic control with applications in the areas of vehicles, intelligent transportation systems, aircraft, computer disks servo control, noise and vibration cancellation and other applications. He is an expert in Robust Adaptive Control and he is known for the use of σ-modification and switching σ-modification in establishing robustness in Adaptive control. He was one of the pioneers in making adaptive control practical by proposing robustness modifications that prevent instabilities and guarantee performance and robustness. He has been working on advanced vehicle concepts that involved drive by wire, steer by wire and later on cruise control and intelligent cruise control systems in collaboration with major automotive companies in the US. Intelligent cruise control systems also known as Adaptive Cruise Control (ACC) systems allow automatic vehicle following with collision avoidance capabilities for safety and driver comfort in addition to positive environmental impact. He was the first to prove that ACC systems can be designed to guarantee stable vehicle following known as string stability without using vehicle to vehicle communication .

Ioannou’s research also involves the design of control systems for vibration control with applications to laser pointing devices, mechanical systems, noise cancellation devices and disk drive servo control and camera image stabilization.

His research in the area of transportation involves traffic flow modeling and control as well as freight optimum routing and port automation. The development of a traffic simulation of the road network that feeds into Los Angeles International Airport allows the evaluation of different technologies and concepts that influence the traffic around the terminals.

== Awards ==
- 1984 – George Axelby Best Paper Award
- 1985 – NSF Presidential Young Investigator Award
- 1992 – Fellow of the Institute of Electrical and Electronics Engineers
- 2006 – Fellow of the International Federation of Automatic Control
- 2008 – IEEE ITS Outstanding Application Award
- 2009 – Institution of Engineering and Technology (IET) Heaviside Medal for Achievement in Control
- 2016 – IEEE Transportation Technologies Award
- 2016 – Recipient of the Viterbi School of Engineering Senior Research Award, University of Southern California
- 2019 – Recipient of Viterbi School of Engineering User-Inspired Research Award, University of Southern California
- 2024 – Fellow of Asia-Pacific Artificial Intelligence Association
- 2024 – Recipient of ASME Rufus Oldenburger Medal
- 2024 – Recipient of IEEE ITS Society Lifetime Achievement Award
- 2024 – Recipient of University Professor Award, highest recognition given by the University of Southern California

== Books ==
Ioannou, Petros; Kokotovic, Petar (1983). Adaptive Systems with Reduced Models. Springer-Verlag. ISBN 978-3-540-12150-3.

Ioannou, Petros; Sun, Jing (2012). Robust Adaptive Control. Dover Books on Electrical Engineering. ISBN 978-0-486-49817-1.

Ioannou, Petros; Fidan, Barış (2006). Adaptive Control Tutorial. SIAM – Society for Industrial & Applied Mathematics. ISBN 978-0-898-71615-3.

Ioannou, Petros (2008). Intelligent Freight Transportation. CRC Press. ISBN 978-0-367-45268-1.

Tsakalis, Kostas; Ioannou, Petros (1993). Linear Time Varying Plants: Control and Adaptation. Prentice-Hall. ISBN 978-3-540-12150-3.

Ioannou, Petros (1997). Automated Highway Systems. Plenum. ISBN 978-1-4757-4573-3.

Ioannou, Petros; Pitsillides, Andreas (2007). Modelling and Control of Complex Systems. CRC Press. ISBN 978-0-849-37985-7.

Ioannou, Petros (2021). Mathematics and Tools for Financial Engineering. SIAM - Society for Industrial & Applied Mathematics. ISBN 978-1-611-97675-5.

Ioannou, Petros, ed. (2024). Adaptive Control Theory and Applications. IntechOpen. ISBN 978-0-85466-714-7.

Ioannou, Petros; Malikopoulos, Andreas A., eds. (2024). Transportation Mobility in Smart Cities'. Springer Nature Switzerland AG, Springer Tracts on Transportation and Trafﬁc. ISBN 978-3-031-64769-7.

== Publications (selected) ==
1. M. Polycarpou and P. Ioannou, “A Robust Adaptive Nonlinear Control Design” Automatica, Vol. 32, No. 3, pp. 423–427, March 1996.
2. H. Xu, M. Mirmirani, and P. A. Ioannou, "Adaptive Sliding Mode Control Design for a Hypersonic Flight Vehicle," AIAA Journal of Guidance, Control, and Dynamics, Vol 27, pp 829–838, September–October 2004.
3. P. A. Ioannou and K. S. Tsakalis, "A Robust Direct Adaptive Controller," IEEE Transactions on Automatic Control, Vol. 31, No. 11, November 1986.
4. P. A. Ioannou and P. V. Kokotovic, "Instability Analysis and Improvement of Robustness of Adaptive Systems," Automatica, Vol. 20, No. 5, September 1984, pp. 583–594
5. C. I. Liu, H. Jula, and P.A. Ioannou, “Design, simulation, and evaluation of automated container terminals,” IEEE Transactions on Intelligent Transportation Systems, vol. 3, no. 1, March 2002 pp. 12–27.
6. K. S. Tsakalis and P. A. Ioannou, "Adaptive Control of Linear Time-Varying Plants: A New Model Reference Controller Structure," IEEE Transactions on Automatic Control, Vol. 34, No. 10, pp. 1038–1047, October 1989.
7. H. Jula, A. Chassiakos, and P. Ioannou, “Port dynamic empty container reuse,” Transportation Research – Part E, Vol. 42, No. 1, pp. 43–60, Jan. 2006
8. Kahveci N. and P. Ioannou, ‘Adaptive steering control for uncertain ship dynamics and stability analysis’, Automatica, vol. 49, no. 3, pp. 685–697, March 2013
9. Vadim Butakov and Petros Ioannou "Driver/Vehicle Response Diagnostic System for the Vehicle Following Case," IEEE Transactions on Intelligent Transportation Systems, Vol.15, no.5, Oct. 2014, pp. 1947–1957
10. Y. Zhao and P. Ioannou, “Positive Train Control with Dynamic Headway Based on an Active Communication System", IEEE Transactions on Intelligent Transportation Systems, vol.16, no.6, pp. 3095–3103, Dec. 2015.
11. S. Jafari, P. A. Ioannou, and L. Rudd, "Adaptive Feedback Suppression of Unknown Periodic Components of Acoustic Noises with Time-Varying Characteristics," Journal of Vibration and Control, pp. 1–13, 2015.
12. Yihang Zhang and Petros A. Ioannou, "Stability analysis and variable speed limit control of a traffic flow model," Transportation Research Part B: Methodological, 118, 31-65, 2018.
1. Yihang Zhang and Petros A. Ioannou, "Stability analysis and variable speed limit control of a traffic flow model," Transportation Research Part B: Methodological, 118, 31-65, 2018.

== See also ==
- Adaptive Cruise Control
