= Chain letter (disambiguation) =

A chain letter is a letter requesting that the recipient distribute copies of it to others.

Chain letter may also refer to:

- Chain Letter (film), a 2010 horror film
- Chain Letter (album), a 2005 album by American R&B singer Brooke Valentine
- Chain Letter (American game show), the 1966 U.S. game show
- Chain Letters, a UK game show
- Chain Letters (album), an album by Supastition

== See also ==
- Chain mail (disambiguation)
