= A. V. Balakrishnan =

American mathematician (1922–2015)

- Born: December 4, 1922; India
- Died: March 17, 2015 (aged 92); Los Angeles
- Education: University of Madras; University of Southern California
- Awards: Richard E. Bellman Control Heritage Award (2001)
- Scientific career
- Fields: Control theory
- Workplaces: The Henry Samueli School of Engineering and Applied Sciences, University of California, Los Angeles
- Doctoral advisor: Ralph S. Phillips

Alampallam Venkatachalaiyer Balakrishnan (1922-2015) was an American applied mathematician and professor at the University of California, Los Angeles.

== Education and career ==
Balakrishnan grew up in Chennai, India, and entered the University of Madras in the early 1940s. While there he earned a scholarship from the Indian government to study in the United States and learn to produce documentaries. Upon arriving at the University of Southern California, known for its film school, he initially wanted to become a sound engineer on Hollywood films. At the time, he was unable to get a position because he was not a member of any of the guilds, which controlled who was able to get a jobs. Therefore, after earning his first master's degree in cinema in 1949, he switched to electrical engineering. Balakrishnan received his M.S. in electrical engineering and his Ph.D. in mathematics from the University of Southern California in 1950 and 1954, respectively.

He was a professor of engineering and professor of mathematics starting in 1965 at The University of California, Los Angeles. He was chair of the Department of Systems Science in the (then) School of Engineering from 1969 to 1975, and director of the NASA-UCLA Flight Systems Research Center since 1985.

== Recognition ==
He was a recipient of the Richard E. Bellman Control Heritage Award, which is the highest recognition of professional achievement for US control systems engineers and scientists in 2001 for "pioneering contributions to stochastic and distributed systems theory, optimization, control, and aerospace flight systems research".

He has received honors and awards from the International Federation of Information Processing Society (1977), NASA (1978, 1992,1995, and 1996), and, in 1980, the Guillemin Prize in recognition of the major impact that his original contributions have had in setting the research direction of communications and control.

In 2016, USC Viterbi Professor Petros Ioannou became the inaugural A.V. “Bal” Balakrishnan Chair of the Ming Hsieh Department of Electrical Engineering.
