= Perceptual computing =

Type of computer applications

Perceptual computing is an application of Lotfi A. Zadeh's theory of computing with words on the field of assisting people to make subjective judgments.

== Perceptual computer ==
The perceptual computer – Per-C – an instantiation of perceptual computing – has the architecture that is depicted in Fig. 1 [2]–[6]. It consists of three components: encoder, CWW engine and decoder. Perceptions – words – activate the Per-C and are the Per-C output (along with data); so, it is possible for a human to interact with the Per-C using just a vocabulary.

Figure 1. Architecture for the perceptual computer.

A vocabulary is application (context) dependent, and must be large enough so that it lets the end-user interact with the Per-C in a user-friendly manner. The encoder transforms words into fuzzy sets (FSs) and leads to a codebook – words with their associated FS models. The outputs of the encoder activate a Computing With Words (CWW) engine, whose output is one or more other FSs, which are then mapped by the decoder into a recommendation (subjective judgment) with supporting data. The recommendation may be in the form of a word, group of similar words, rank or class.

Although many details are needed in order to implement the Per-C's three components – encoder, decoder and CWW engine – and they are covered in [5], it is when the Per-C is applied to specific applications, that the focus on the methodology becomes clear. Stepping back from those details, the methodology of perceptual computing is:

1. Focus on an application (A).
2. Establish a vocabulary (or vocabularies) for A.
3. Collect interval end-point data from a group of subjects (representative of the subjects who will use the Per-C) for all of the words in the vocabulary.
4. Map the collected word data into word-FOUs by using the Interval Approach [1], [5, Ch. 3]. The result of doing this is the codebook (or codebooks) for A, and completes the design of the encoder of the Per-C.
5. Choose an appropriate CWW engine for A. It will map IT2 FSs into one or more IT2 FSs. Examples of CWW engines are: IF-THEN rules [5, Ch. 6] and Linguistic Weighted Averages [6], [5, Ch. 5].
6. If an existing CWW engine is available for A, then use its available mathematics to compute its output(s). Otherwise, develop such mathematics for the new kind of CWW engine. The new CWW engine should be constrained so that its output(s) resemble the FOUs in the codebook(s) for A.
7. Map the IT2 FS outputs from the CWW engine into a recommendation at the output of the decoder. If the recommendation is a word, rank or class, then use existing mathematics to accomplish this mapping [5, Ch. 4]. Otherwise, develop such mathematics for the new kind of decoder.

== Applications of Per-C ==
To-date a Per-C has been implemented for the following four applications: (1) investment decision-making, (2) social judgment making, (3) distributed decision making, and (4) hierarchical and distributed decision-making. A specific example of the fourth application is the so-called Journal Publication Judgment Advisor [5, Ch. 10] in which for the first time only words are used at every level of the following hierarchical and distributed decision making process:

n reviewers have to provide a subjective recommendation about a journal article that has been sent to them by the Associate Editor, who then has to aggregate the independent recommendations into a final recommendation that is sent to the Editor-in-Chief of the journal. Because it is very problematic to ask reviewers to provide numerical scores for paper-evaluation sub-categories (the two major categories are Technical Merit and Presentation), such as importance, content, depth, style, organization, clarity, references, etc., each reviewer will only be asked to provide a linguistic score for each of these categories. They will not be asked for an overall recommendation about the paper because in the past it is quite common for reviewers who provide the same numerical scores for such categories to give very different publishing recommendations. By leaving a specific recommendation to the associate editor such inconsistencies can hope to be eliminated.

How words can be aggregated to reflect each reviewer's recommendation as well as the expertise of each reviewer about the paper's subject matter is done using a linguistic weighted average. Although the journal publication judgment advisor uses reviewers and an associate editor, the word “reviewer” could be replaced by judge, expert, low-level manager, commander, referee, etc., and the term “associate editor” could be replaced by control center, command center, higher-level manager, etc. So, this application has potential wide applicability to many other applications.

Recently, a new Per-C based Failure mode and effects analysis (FMEA) methodology was developed, with its application to edible bird's nest farming, in Borneo, has been reported.

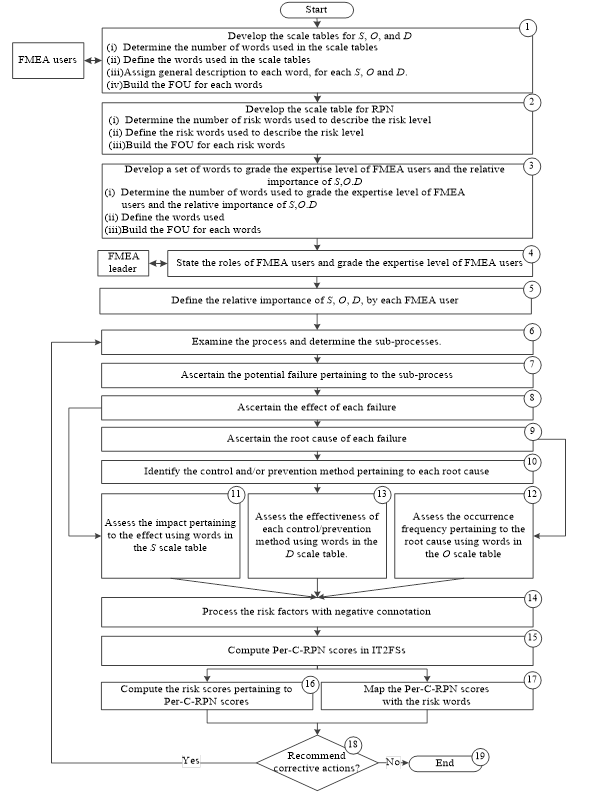
A Perceptual Computing Based Failure Mode and Effect Analysis Methodology

In addition, application of Per-C based method to educational assessment, for cooperative learning of students has been reported.

In summary, the Per-C (whose development has taken more than a decade) is the first complete implementation of Zadeh's CWW paradigm, as applied to assisting people to make subjective judgments.

== See also ==
- Computational intelligence
- Expert system
- Fuzzy control system
- Fuzzy logic
- Granular computing
- Rough set
- Type-2 fuzzy sets and systems
- Vagueness

== Sources ==
- F. Liu and J. M. Mendel, “Encoding words into interval type-2 fuzzy sets using an Interval Approach,” IEEE Trans. on Fuzzy Systems, vol. 16, pp 1503–1521, December 2008.
- J. M. Mendel, “The perceptual computer: an architecture for computing with words,” Proc. of Modeling With Words Workshop in the Proc. of FUZZ-IEEE 2001, pp. 35–38, Melbourne, Australia, 2001.
- J. M. Mendel, “An architecture for making judgments using computing with words,” Int. J. Appl. Math. Comput. Sci., vol. 12, No. 3, pp. 325–335, 2002
- J. M. Mendel, “Computing with words and its relationships with fuzzistics,” Information Sciences, vol. 177, pp. 998–1006, 2007.
- J. M. Mendel and D. Wu, Perceptual Computing: Aiding People in Making Subjective Judgments, John Wiley and IEEE Press, 2010.
- D.Wu and J. M. Mendel, “Aggregation using the linguistic weighted average and interval type-2 fuzzy sets,” IEEE Trans. on Fuzzy Systems, vol. 15, no. 6, pp. 1145–1161, 2007.
- L. A. Zadeh, “Fuzzy logic = computing with words,” IEEE Trans. on Fuzzy Systems, vol. 4, pp. 103–111, 1996.
