= Claire J. Tomlin =

American researcher and aviation engineer

Claire Tomlin
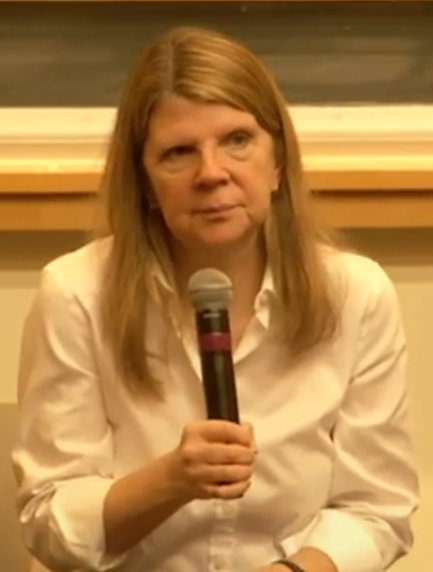
- At the 2023 panel discussion "The AI Revolution"
- Born: 1969 (age 56–57); Southampton, England
- Citizenship: British
- Education: University of Waterloo; Imperial College London; University of California, Berkeley,
- Spouse: S. Shankar Sastry
- Awards: Macarthur Fellowship Program
- Scientific career
- Fields: Hybrid control systems
- Workplaces: Stanford University; University of California, Berkeley
- Doctoral advisor: S. Shankar Sastry
- Doctoral students: Meeko Oishi

Claire Jennifer Tomlin (born 1969) is a British researcher in hybrid systems, distributed and decentralized optimization and control theory and holds the Charles A. Desoer Chair at the University of California, at Berkeley.

== Career ==
Claire J. Tomlin was born in Southampton, England in 1969. She graduated from the University of Waterloo with a B.A.Sc. in electrical engineering in 1992, from Imperial College London with a M.Sc. in electrical engineering in 1993, and from the University of California, Berkeley with a PhD in electrical engineering and computer sciences in 1998. She held the positions of assistant, associate, and full professor at the Department of Aeronautics and Astronautics and the Department of Electrical Engineering at Stanford University from 1998 to 2007, where she was a director of the Hybrid Systems Laboratory. She currently holds the Charles A. Desoer Chair in Engineering at UC Berkeley.

Prof. Tomlin's research focuses on applications, unmanned aerial vehicles, air traffic control and modeling of biological processes. She was named a MacArthur Fellow in September 2006.

== Honours ==
She received the Erlander Professorship of the Swedish Research Council in 2009, a MacArthur Fellowship in 2006, and the Eckman Award of the American Automatic Control Council in 2003. In 2003, she was named to the MIT Technology Review TR100 as one of the top 100 innovators in the world under the age of 35.

She became a Fellow of the IEEE in 2010. She was awarded the IEEE Transportation Technologies Award in 2017 "for contributions to air transportation systems, focusing on collision avoidance protocol design and avionics safety verification." She was elected a fellow of the American Institute for Medical and Biological Engineering (AIMBE) in 2016 for "outstanding contributions to the development of mathematical models that link molecular networks to the cellular processes they control." She was elected to the American Academy of Arts and Sciences in 2019. In 2020 she was named a Fellow of the International Federation of Automatic Control.

== Works ==
- Maria Domenica Di Benedetto; Alberto Sangiovanni-Vincentelli, eds. (2001). "Lateral Inhibition through Delta-Notch Signaling". Hybrid systems: computation and control : 4th International Workshop. Springer. ISBN 978-3-540-41866-5. LCCN 2001020731. OL 9616538M.
- Rajeev Alur; George J. Pappas, eds. (2004). "Inference Methods for Autonomous Stochastic Linear Hybrid Systems". Hybrid systems: computation and control : 7th international workshop. Springer. ISBN 978-3-540-21259-1. LCCN 2004046613. OL 9582737M.
- Alberto Bemporad; Antonio Bicchi; Giorgio C. Buttazzo, eds. (2007). "A New Hybrid State Estimator for Systems with Limited Mode Changes". Hybrid systems: computation and control : 10th international conference. Springer. ISBN 978-3-540-71492-7. LCCN 2007922928. OL 9707661M.

== See also ==
- List of University of Waterloo people
