= Canadian Society of Transplantation =

Professional organization

The Canadian Society of Transplantation (CST) is the professional organization for physicians, surgeons, scientists and allied health professionals working in the field of transplantation in Canada. It was founded in 1980, and grew to include over 600 members by 2008. CST collaborates with the Canadian Institute for Health Information to maintain the Canadian Organ Replacement Registry (CORR).

Notable past presidents of the CST include John Dossetor (1983–84), Neil McKenzie (1988–89), and James Shapiro (2007–08).
