= Ali Emadi =

Ali Emadi is a Canada Excellence Research Chair in Hybrid Powertrain at McMaster University in Hamilton, Ontario.

== Awards ==
- In 2013, he was named a Fellow of the Institute of Electrical and Electronics Engineers (IEEE) for his contributions to electric power conversion and control for electric and hybrid vehicles.
- In 2017, he was named a fellow of the National Academy of Inventors.
- He received the 2026 IEEE Transportation Technologies Award, "for leadership in transportation electrification and electrified powertrains".
