= Village Fire =

EP by James
- Released: June 1985
- Recorded: August 1983 & October 1984
- Studio: Strawberry Studios, Stockport
- Genre: Folk
- Length: 12:20
- Label: Factory
- Producer: Chris Nagle

James chronology
| James II (1985) | Village Fire (1985) | Chain Mail (1986) |

Village Fire is the third EP by James, released in 1985 by Factory Records. It contains all five tracks from their previously released EPs Jimone (side A) and James II (side B). The cover artwork was produced by John Carroll, whose childlike images were synonymous with much of the group's early work.

== Reception ==
Professional ratings
Review scores
| Source | Rating |
|---|---|
| Q | 3/5 stars |

Barney Hoskyns of Spin wrote, "An even more delicious assault on pop music than the Smiths. The five songs are clean and clear, loose but supple, stemming from a basic Velvet Underground germ and stripped of power-rock trappings. They are honest and cheerful and witty and involving."

== Track listing ==
From Jimone:

1. "What's the World" – 1:55
2. "Folklore" – 2:49
3. "Fire So Close" – 1:45

From James II:

1. "If Things Were Perfect" – 3:00
2. "Hymn from a Village" – 2:51

== Personnel ==
- Tim Booth - Vocals
- Jim Glennie - Bass guitar
- Paul Gilbertson (Jimone) / Larry Gott (James II) - Lead guitar
- Gavan Whelan - Drums
