= Andreas A. Malikopoulos =

Control theorist and engineer

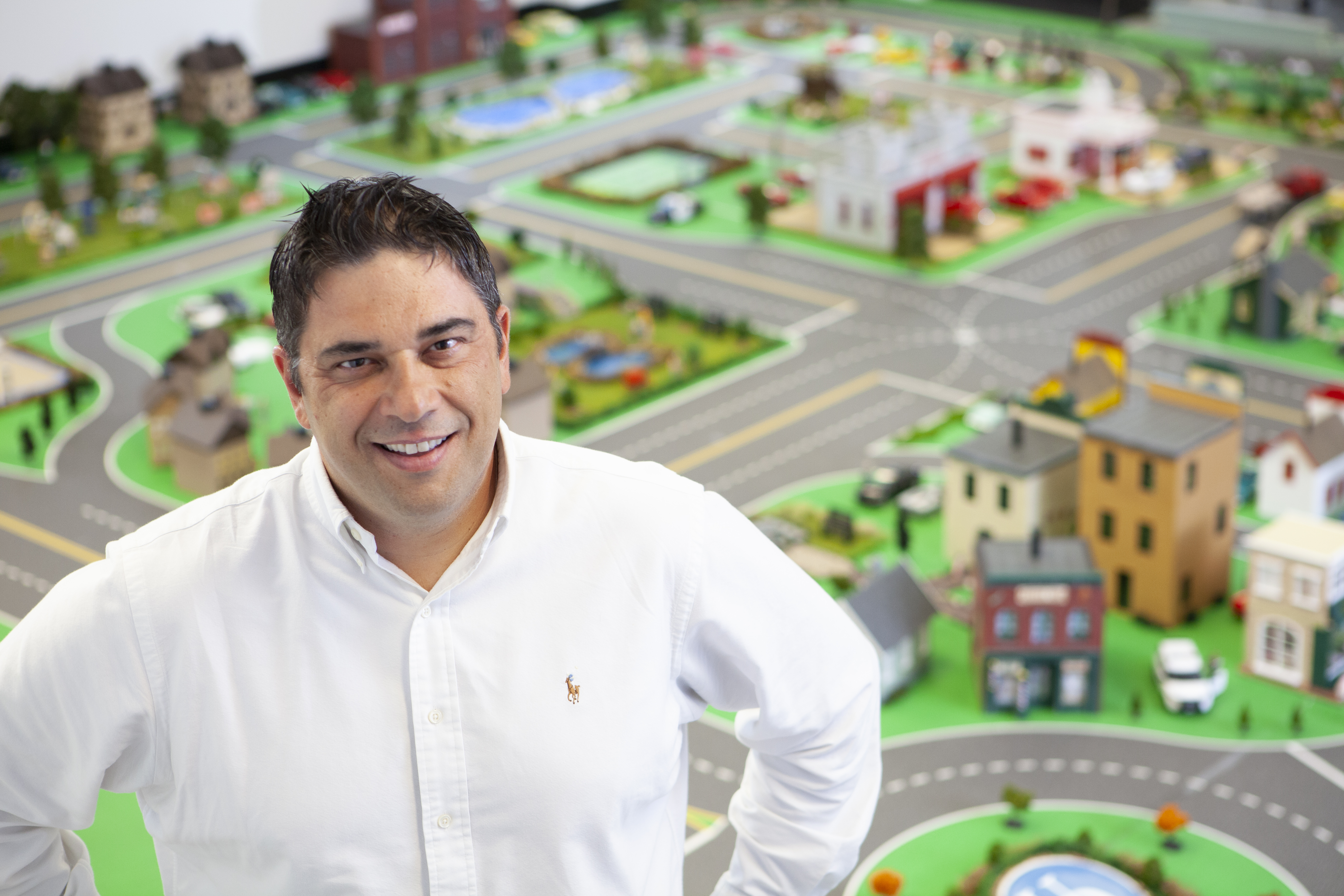
- Born: Athens, Greece
- Citizenship: United States
- Education: Ellinogermaniki Agogi (Elementary and Middle School) and 2nd Lyceum Ymittou (High School); National Technical University of Athens (MEng); University of Michigan, Ann Arbor (M.S., Ph.D)
- Known for: Control theory, team theory with applications to emerging mobility systems
- Scientific career
- Fields: Mechanical Engineering; Systems Engineering; Robotics
- Thesis: Real-time, self-learning identification and stochastic optimal control of advanced powertrain systems
- Doctoral advisor: Dennis N. Assanis; Panos Papalambros
- Website: https://www.duffield.cornell.edu/people/andreas-malikopoulos/

Andreas A. Malikopoulos (Greek: Ανδρέας Μαλικόπουλος) is a Greek-American control theorist and engineer. He is a Professor at Cornell University, with affiliations in Applied Mathematics, Systems Engineering, Mechanical Engineering, Electrical and Computer Engineering, and Civil and Environmental Engineering. He is also the Director of the Information and Decision Science (IDS) Laboratory.

Malikopoulos' research bridges control theory and learning to enable systems such as vehicles, robots, and large-scale infrastructure to operate autonomously while achieving near-optimal performance and safely adapting to dynamic environments.

== Early life and education ==
Malikopoulos was born in Athens, Greece, where he developed an early interest in mathematics and engineering. He earned a Diploma in Mechanical Engineering from the National Technical University of Athens in 2000.

He later pursued graduate studies at the University of Michigan, earning a Master of Science degree in 2004 and a Ph.D. in Mechanical Engineering in 2008.

At Michigan, he studied under Dennis N. Assanis and Panos Y. Papalambros. His doctoral research focused on real-time, self-learning stochastic optimal control of advanced powertrain systems.

His dissertation introduced a learning-based control framework that transforms internal combustion engines into adaptive intelligent systems capable of learning driver behavior. These systems can optimize performance metrics such as fuel efficiency and emissions while identifying and adapting to individual driving styles.

This work resulted in a U.S. patent and was made available for licensing through the University of Michigan’s Technology Transfer Office.

== Career ==
Before joining Cornell, Malikopoulos held academic and research positions at the University of Delaware, Oak Ridge National Laboratory, and General Motors Research & Development.

During this period, he contributed to the development and commercialization of advanced control technologies for energy-efficient and connected vehicle systems.

== Research ==
Malikopoulos' research lies at the intersection of control theory, learning, and decision-making, with applications in autonomous systems, robotics, and intelligent infrastructure. He has advanced the theoretical foundations of decentralized stochastic control and team decision theory, developing methods for coordination among agents operating under asymmetric or incomplete information.

He has resolved long-standing open problems in team theory and introduced mathematical frameworks that integrate reinforcement learning with decision-theoretic principles and multi-agent coordination. He has also developed control strategies for connected and automated vehicles, enabling fuel-efficient and collision-free coordination in complex traffic scenarios such as intersections and merging zones. These technologies have been experimentally validated at MCity under the ARPA-E NEXTCAR program, demonstrating improvements in energy efficiency of at least 25% in vehicles such as the Audi A3 e-tron. Some of these technologies have been commercialized by Robert Bosch GmbH.
