= Jimone =

EP by James
- Released: November 1983
- Recorded: August 1983, Strawberry Studios, Stockport
- Genre: Post-punk; indie rock
- Length: 6:29
- Label: Factory
- Producer: Chris Nagle

James chronology
Jimone (1983)	James II (1985)

Jimone was the first release by Mancunian band James, released in November 1983 by Factory Records. It contained three tracks that also later appeared on the band's Village Fire EP. Fire So Close being a slightly different mix from the 7" version. According to the band's biography Folklore by Stuart Maconie, the band were fearful of tarnishing their best songs in the studio, so instead opted to record the three songs they felt were their worst.

The track "What's The World" has been covered by The Smiths (live recording on "I Started Something I Couldn't Finish"). It has remained popular among die-hard James fans to the present day and was still occasionally being featured in setlists as late as 1998.

"Folklore" lent its name to Stuart Maconie's biography of the band in 2000, while "Fire So Close" was later radically reworked under the title of "Why So Close" on the band's debut 1986 album Stutter.

== Track listing ==
1. "Folklore" – 2:46
2. "What's The World" – 1:52
3. "Fire So Close" – 1:46

== Personnel ==
- Tim Booth - Vocals
- Jim Glennie - Bass guitar
- Paul Gilbertson - Lead guitar
- Gavan Whelan - Drums
