= Meeko Oishi =

American control theorist

Meeko Mitsuko Karen Oishi is an American engineer and control theorist. She is Gardner Zemke Professor of Electrical and Computer Engineering at the University of New Mexico.

== Research ==
Oishi's research focuses on the safety of human-in-the-loop systems for transportation, assistive technology, and robotics, using methods based on stochastic control. She has also studied motor control in Parkinson's disease patients, and the effects of intelligent lighting on circadian rhythms.

She participated with Joan Roughgarden on a controversial paper in Science applying cooperative game theory to sexual selection, later expanded into a book by Roughgarden.

== Education and career ==
Oishi is originally from Albuquerque, New Mexico. She majored in mechanical engineering at Princeton University, graduating in 1998. She went to Stanford University for graduate study in mechanical engineering, where she earned a master's degree in 2000 and completed her Ph.D. in 2004, under the supervision of Claire J. Tomlin.

She was a postdoctoral researcher at the National Ecological Observational Network and Sandia National Laboratories. She became a faculty member at the University of British Columbia from 2006 to 2011 before moving to her present position at the University of New Mexico in 2011. At the University of New Mexico, she was named Regents' Lecturer for 2015–2018. She was promoted to full professor in 2020, and named Gardner Zemke Professor for 2020–2022.
