= IEEE Transportation Technologies Award =

- Awarded for: Advances in technologies within the fields of interest to the IEEE as applied in transportation systems
- Presented by: IEEE
- First award: 2011
- Website: IEEE Transportation Technologies Award

The IEEE Transportation Technologies Award is a technical field award given for advances in technologies within the fields of interest to the IEEE as applied in transportation systems. This IEEE-level award, was created in 2011 by the board of directors of the IEEE and sponsored by the IEEE Industry Applications Society, IEEE Industrial Electronics Society, IEEE Intelligent Transportation Systems Society, IEEE Microwave Theory and Techniques Society, IEEE Power Electronics Society, IEEE Power & Energy Society, IEEE Vehicular Technology Society. The award is given to an individual, a team, or multiple recipients up to three in number.

Recipients of this award receive a bronze medal, a certificate, and an honorarium.

== Recipients ==
The following people have received the IEEE Transportation Technologies Award :

- 2027: Chunting Mi
- 2026: Ali Emadi
- 2025: Fei-Yue Wang
- 2024: V. Anand Sankaran
- 2023: Holger Meinel
- 2022: Ouyang Minggao
- 2021: Philip T. Krein
- 2020: Markos Papageorgiou
- 2019: Hao Huang
- 2018: C.C. Chan
- 2017: Claire J.Tomlin
- 2016: Petros Ioannou
- 2015: Robert Dean King
- 2014: Linos J. Jacovides
