= Panos Papalambros =

Greek American academic

Panos Papalambros is a Greek American academic best known for his work on design optimization of products and complex systems, and for his leadership in advancing transformative engineering design research and education, including establishing Design Science as a rigorous scientific discipline. He is a Professor Emeritus of Mechanical Engineering at the University of Michigan, Ann Arbor, where he has been recognized as the James B. Angell Distinguished University Professor Emeritus and the Donald C. Graham Professor Emeritus of Engineering. He also served as Professor of Architecture and Urban Planning; Professor of Art and Design; and Professor and founding Chair of the Integrative Systems and Design Division, College of Engineering, at the University of Michigan. He is a member of the National Academy of Engineering.

== Publications ==
A list of research areas he has worked in can be found here Recent research contributions include areas such as Design for Crowdsourcing (Crowdreviewing), Design for Market Preference, Data-Driven Modeling for Design and Systems Design.

With D.J. Wilde, Papalambros co-authored the standard textbook Principles of Optimal Design: Modeling and Computation (1988, 2000, 2017) highlighting the interplay between the mathematical modeling of design as a decision-making problem and the computational algorithms that will allow the practitioner to solve these Design Optimization problems successfully.

During his 2008-2012 service as Technical Editor in Chief of the Journal of Mechanical Design(Transactions of The American Society of Mechanical Engineers ASME), Papalambros advocated the broadening of the scope of engineering design to encompass theories from the behavioral sciences, management, and marketing to support and augment engineering decision making. He has pursued this advocacy further in his service as Editor in Chief of the Design Science Journal launched in 2015 as a collaboration of The Design Society and Cambridge University Press.

== Biography ==
Papalambros was born and grew up in Patras, Greece. After graduating from the National Technical University of Athens in 1974 (Mechanical and Electrical Engineering), he continued with graduate studies at Stanford University, earning an MS (1976) and PhD (1979) in Mechanical Engineering, Design Division. Upon graduation, Papalambros joined the University of Michigan as a faculty member in Mechanical Engineering.

During his tenure at Michigan he served as Mechanical Engineering Department Chair (1992–98, 2007–08) and as founding director of the research laboratories and centers: Optimal Design Laboratory (1980-); Ford Durability Simulation Center (1992–94); Automotive Research Center (1994-2003); and General Motors Collaborative Research Laboratory (1998-2002).

During 2006-2011 he served as the founding chair and director of the University of Michigan interdisciplinary Design Science Doctoral Program. He currently serves as President of the Design Society (2017–19)
