= Strip-mine (album) =

Studio album by James
- Released: 26 September 1988
- Recorded: March 1987
- Studio: Rockfield, Rockfield, Wales
- Genre: Folk-pop
- Length: 35:32
- Label: Sire, Blanco y Negro
- Producer: Hugh Jones; Steve Power; Steve Lovell

James chronology
Stutter (1986)	Strip-mine (1988)	One Man Clapping (1989)

Singles from Strip-mine
- 1. "What For" Released: 28 March 1988; 2. "Ya Ho" Released: 12 September 1988

Strip-mine is the second studio album by English rock band James. It was released on 26 September 1988, through Sire and Blanco y Negro Records. After minimal touring and lack of success for their debut studio album Stutter (1986), the label was apprehensive about letting them record another album. Sessions for it were held in early 1987 at Rockfield Studios with Hugh Jones producing the majority of the album, except for "Are You Ready", which produced by Steve Power and Steve Lovell. After the recording, the release was delayed a number of times, until it was eventually remixed early the following year at London's Battery Studios. Described as a folk-pop album, the songs on Strip-mine tackled the topics of misinformation, addiction, and human mortality.

Strip-mine received generally positive reviews from music critics, some of whom praised the quality of the songwriting. It peaked at number 90 in the United Kingdom, as did "What For". Following the album's remixing, James had management issues; "What For" was released as the lead single in March 1988. They went on a UK tour in May 1988, supported by the Stone Roses. "Ya Ho" was released as the album's second single in September 1988, which was followed by a UK tour, supported by the Happy Mondays. In November 1988, the band left Sire, and by the following month, drummer Gavin Whelan was ousted from the band.

== Background ==
James released their debut studio album Stutter in July 1986, through Sire and Blanco y Negro Records. It was met with positive reviews, and was promoted with a four-show UK tour the following month. Aside from some performances in Europe, the band opted not to tour in support of the album, which they later regretted. Alongside this, the album had little press advertising due to lack of funding. According to frontman Tim Booth, the sole feedback the band received about the album from Sire was that it was deemed "too English." Sire were annoyed by the album's lack of success, and in spite of feeling disenfranchised, the band took on board the label's criticisms. As a result, the demos for their next album were leaning in more of a commercial direction.

Seymour Stein, who was the head of Sire and had signed the band, was difficult to contact, according to Booth. If the band wanted to do anything, they had to run it past Stein first, which would take weeks before they could even get in contact with him. Despite having a label manager at the WEA Records office in London, the band sought the assistance of Geoff Travis of Rough Trade Records. He acted as a liaison between the band and Stein. Around this time, Booth had been romantically involved with the band's manager Martine McDonagh, who Stein disliked. He told the band to drop her, otherwise communication would stall. McDonagh made a plan that her business associates Elliot Rashman and Andy Dodd would manage the band while she took a behind-the-scenes role.

== Production ==
Hugh Jones saw the band live, and talked to them after the show. He was critical of Stutter, stating that the band had lost their sound between the release of their Factory Records output and the album. James had a strained relationship with their label Sire Records; the situation almost made it to court, before the label gave in and provided the band money to record their next album. Strip-mine was recorded at Rockfield Studios with Jones as the producer for the most part; Steve Power and Steve Lovell produced "Are You Ready". Sessions concluded in March 1987; Jones spent five 20-hour days mixing the album, running on zero hours of sleep. The band weren't keen on his mixes, which unsuccessfully attempted to capture the sound of their early singles.

Rashman and Dodd spent five months persuading Sire, who saw the band as a liability by this point, to give them more money to remix the album. Around the time Sire greenlight the proposal, two of their popular acts – the Housemartins and the Smiths – had broken up, and were anticipating James to be their next breakthrough artist. In early 1988, Power was drafted in to mix all of the tracks in a single day at Battery Studios in London, except for "Riders" and "Refrain", which were done by Jones. The resultant sound saw Whelan's drums being pushed to the front of the recordings' mix, with some songs seeing minor alterations, such as harmonies in "What For" being placed lower in the mix. The sequencing was changed as well, with "Refrain" and "Vulture" being moved towards the album's end.

== Composition ==
Musically, the sound of Strip-mine has been described as folk-pop, with influence from the Smiths. All of the lyrics were written by Booth, while all of the tracks were written by James. The band opted to take a less-is-more approach to the song writing, with drummer Gavan Whelan adding that "there's more space and thought." "Ya Ho" and "Vulture" include elements of African music. The Kick Horns added brass to "Charlie Dance"; Richard Evens added keyboards to "Are You Ready", and Clive Mellot provided maracas for "Ya Ho". In addition to their regular roles, Whelan played piano, and guitarist Larry Gott did keyboards and flute.

The opening track "What For" began as an entry for the Eurovision Song Contest, and changed several times as the band felt its first iteration was too poppy, and lacked any kind of serious statement. The song was inspired by the balance between the cars and pollution of Manchester, and the free-roaming nature of birds above the city's skyline. The horn-driven "Charlie Dance" was written after the Chernobyl disaster, and talks about being given misinformation from the government. The folk-pop "Fairground" was the result of an argument between the band in a rehearsal space. Gott and Whelan went to one side of the room, and Booth and bassist Jim Glennie went to the other. Both pairs were playing different sections, which were recorded. Upon hearing them back, Gott thought it came across as "galloping horses at a fairground." The guitarwork in "Are You Ready" recalled the sound of Lloyd Cole; its overall sound was influenced by Whelan, who wanted a more conventional rock sound.

"Medieval" includes a recorder solo, and a chant of "We are sound". Booth said "Not There" featured his first lyrics in regards to addictions, tackling the band's original guitarist Paul Gilbertson, adding that he "watched a close friend's spirit being slowly drunk by the alcohol." "Ya Ho" talks about saving people from whirlpools, and the fear of failure. It began as a short story from Booth about a tribe living on a beach, before being turned into a song. Booth wrote "Riders" after having a dream where he was in a lecture with several popular musicians. "Vulture" was written five years prior about gluttony and greed, and had appeared during the band's first session with John Peel in a slightly different rendition. It is a highlife song that evokes the sound of Graceland (1986) by Paul Simon. "Stripmining" details human mortality, and was written for a benefit gig following a landside in Italy. The album's closing track, "Refrain", is an instrumental interlude that touches on bluegrass.

== Release ==
James spent four days choosing the track listing for the album due to disagreements between members, and Power providing the band with seven-to-eight different mixes of each track; "What For" had 15 different mixes. Since recording Strip-mine, some of the members worked other jobs: Whelan worked at a hotel, Gott acted as a painter and decorator, and Glennie sold second-hand cars. In August 1987, James played four shows in the UK, marking their first performances in nearly a year. Booth explained that the band had been dealing with a year's worth of business issues. That same month, the band recorded a John Peel session, where they played "Ya Ho", "What For", "Whoops", and "Stowaway". "Ya Ho" was scheduled for release as Strip-mine's lead single in September 1987, however, it was cancelled. Around this time, Rashman and Dodd resigned as the band's managers, and McDonagh was reinstated.

"What For" was instead released as the lead single in March 1988 with "Island Swing", "Not There", and a remix of "What For" as extra tracks. James promoted it with a UK tour in May 1988, with support from the Stone Roses, and a performance on the Granada programme Other Side of Midnight. "Ya Ho" appeared as the second single on 12 September 1988, with "Mosquito", "Left Out of Her Will", and "New Nature" as extra tracks. Strip-mine was released in September 1988, through Sire and Blanco y Negro Records. It had been scheduled for release in March 1987, and pushed back on eight occasions, some as late as two weeks before, prior to its eventual release date. In October, the band embarked on a tour of the UK, with support from the Happy Mondays. In November 1988, James parted ways with Sire through a loophole in their contract which allowed the band to leave if the label hadn't contacted them within a six month period upon delivery of the Strip-mine masters.

During one gig in December 1988, Whelan attacked Booth; he was asked to leave the band, based on the other members having separate incidents with him. Whelan's departure was made public in January 1989, around the time the band was auditioning for a replacement. On 20 March 1989, the band released the live album One Man Clapping as a joint venture between their own label One Man Clapping and Rough Trade Records. The album had been recorded during their October 1988 tour, and had cost £12,000 to finance. It featured two previously unavailable songs, "Stutter" and "Burned", the latter making reference to the events with Sire. The band promoted its release with a short UK tour, with support from the Inspiral Carpets; it marked their first stint with new drummer David Baynton-Power and guitarist/violinist Saul Davies.

"What For" and "Ya Ho" were included on the band's fourth compilation album Fresh as a Daisy – The Singles (2007). The music video for "What For" was included on the career-spanning box set The Gathering Sound (2012). Strip-mine was reissued on CD in 2017 as part of the Justhipper (The Complete Sire & Blanco Y Negro Recordings 1986 – 1988) compilation, with the single version of "Ya Ho", "Mosquito", "Left Out of Her Will", "New Nature", "Island Swing" and the climax remix of "What For" as bonus tracks, and in 2019 through the record label Music on CD.

== Reception ==
Professional ratings
Review scores
Source	Rating
AllMusic	3/5 stars
The Encyclopedia of Popular Music	3/5 stars
MusicHound Rock: The Essential Album Guide	2/5 stars
NME	9/10
Q	4/5 stars
Record Mirror	4/5 stars
Sounds	3.5/5 stars
Martin C. Strong	6/10

Altricia Gethers and Ira Robbins of Trouser Press called the Strip-mine "frequently delightful," with Jones' "crystalline production ... mak[ing] the most of the band’s alluring and intelligent folk-pop." Q writer Mat Snow said James wrote "11 tightly worked but airily evocative songs which should intrigue any connoisseur of a particularly English way of doing things." He added that while "clearly rustic in mood, their tunes are incisively played-tangy, almost high-life guitars beautifully playing off crisply driven rhythms." City Life's Jacqueline Harte noted "What For" as being the most memorable track on the album, with the remainder "bounc[ing] along with only mildly varying levels of accessibility." She added that the "simple, almost naïve, nature of both lyrics and music" provide the perfect backdrop for Booth's vocals. Sounds reviewer Peter Kane said the album "finally emerges on two shy feet with a crisp new production and a batch of songs full of brittle melodies and suitably traumatised vocals." He mentioned that the band's "strongest suit" might be the "modern folksy quality ... that the traditional drums and guitars do little to conceal."

The staff at Melody Maker found the guitarwork to be "frequently insipid and undeveloped, only occasionally ringing true, with lush, lust and an exaggerated love." They referred to the album as being "padd[ed] out, but this is a tentative step forward." AllMusic reviewer Tom Demalon witnessed the band to be "still struggling for their own identity as the overall sound of Strip-Mine continued to be deeply influenced by the Smiths." He added that "[e]verything has a crisp, clean feel, without being distant," due to Jones' production. Don Watson of NME wrote that the album was not "the LP that James are capable of," saying that it was "no match for [their] debut [album]." He noted that at its best, the album's songs are "equally diverse, instinctual rather than immediately recognisable."

Strip-mine reached number 90 on the UK Albums Chart. "What For" reached the same position in the UK Singles Chart.

== Track listing ==
All lyrics by Tim Booth, all tracks written by James.

Side one

1. "What For" – 4:25
2. "Charlie Dance" – 2:24
3. "Fairground" – 3:36
4. "Are You Ready" – 2:26
5. "Medieval" – 3:48

Side two

6. "Not There" – 3:33
7. "Ya Ho" – 4:20
8. "Riders" – 3:11
9. "Vulture" – 4:04
10. "Stripmining" – 3:04
11. "Refrain" – 1:53

== Personnel ==
Personnel per booklet.

James

- Tim Booth – vocals
- Jim Glennie – bass, backing vocals
- Gavan Whelan – drums, piano, backing vocals
- Larry Gott – guitar, keyboards, flute, backing vocals

Additional musicians

- Richard Evans – keyboards (track 4)
- Kick Horns – brass (track 2)
- Clive Mellor – maracas (track 7)

Production and design

- Hugh Jones – producer (all except track 4), mixing (tracks 8 and 11)
- Steve Power – producer (track 4), mixing (all except tracks 8 and 11)
- Steve Lovell – producer (track 4)
- Mark Osborne – photography
- Bracken Harper – design, layout

== Charts ==
Chart performance for Strip-mine
Chart (1988)	Peak position
UK Albums (OCC)	90
