= Crowdreviewing =

Crowdreviewing is the practice of gathering opinion or feedback from a large number of people, typically via the internet or an online community; a portmanteau of "crowd" and "reviews". Crowdreviewing is also often viewed as a form of crowd voting which occurs when a website gathers a large group's opinions and judgment. The concept is based on the principles of crowdsourcing and lets users submit online reviews to participate in building online metrics that measure performance. By harnessing social collaboration in the form of feedback individuals are generally able to form a more informed opinion.

== Role of the crowd ==
In crowdreviewing the crowd becomes the source of information used in determining the relative performance of products and services. As crowdreviewing focuses on receiving input from a large number of parties, the resulting collaboration produces more credible feedback compared to the feedback left by a single party. The responsibility of identifying strengths and weaknesses falls to multiple individuals which each have had their own experience rather than on a single individual. Buyers will therefore be more likely to trust the feedback of a collective group of people rather than a single individual.

== Common Parties ==
The crowd consists of a number of different parties which have various interests in regards to the outcome produced.

=== Potential Customers ===
A potential customer of a product or service would have an interest in viewing information on how a particular product or service stands in terms of subjective or objective quality before making a purchasing decision. Potential customers may also be interested in leaving feedback on a particular product or service to explain why they did not make their purchase.

=== Customers ===
Customers of products and services are a primary party in the process of reviewing. Customers are closely connected to the process as they would have first-hand experience with a product and service. Their primary role would be detailing their experiences with the product or service. A customer's interest in crowdreviewing would stem from an interest in showing their appreciation towards the quality of a product or service or in voicing their concerns or disappointment in a product or service.

=== Sellers ===
Sellers usually get their satisfied customers involved in leaving reviews for their products and services. A seller has an interest in having positive feedback on display as a means to influence potential buyers.

=== Competitors ===
Competitors would have an interest in reviewing feedback from the crowd as a means of obtaining competitive intelligence.

There may be other audiences involved in the process such as employees, suppliers, partners, and other relevant parties.

== Benefits and risks ==
There are a number of benefits to the different parties which make up the crowd. Potential buyers are able to obtain information on products and services prior to making a purchase. Those which have already bought or used the product or service are able to post experiences both positive and negative in order to inform other potential buyers. As an additional benefit to the buyers, buyers may also post negative reviews in hopes of resolving their negative experiences with their seller. Sellers have the benefits of receiving positive feedback and also potentially resolving issues with dissatisfied customers. Competitors are able to learn more about what their competition is doing in order to improve their own products and services.

In addition to the benefits associated with crowdreviewing, there are a number of risks and challenges to overcome. For potential buyers there is always the risk that reviews may be sourced by the vendors themselves or other parties paid to leave a specific type of feedback on a product or service. Sellers have the possibility of receiving negative reviews which may in turn negatively influence their reputation and affect their bottom line revenue numbers. Competitors, while enjoying the benefit of being able to learn from their competitors are also subject to their competitors learning about their positives and negatives.

== Limitations and controversies ==
=== Size of the Crowd ===
One of the major factors influencing crowdreviewing is the size of the crowd involved. A crowdreviewing venture is positively influenced by having a large number of parties leave reviews and feedback on products and services. In cases where a small number of individuals leave their feedback, more weight is placed on an individual reviewer or opinion and could therefore be of minimal value to potential customers. A smaller sample of reviews may also exhibit bias towards or against the product or service.

=== Industry Knowledge ===
A common limitation of allowing all parties to have an opportunity to review a product or service may involve having reviews written without a minimal or meaningful understanding of the product or service. A lack of industry or specialized knowledge may in turn minimize the value of a review or potentially inversely affect what would be considered a fair review.

=== Seller Manipulation ===
With allowing multiple parties to review a product or service there is a possibility that a seller may attempt to manipulate reviews in a number of ways. Sellers may hire third parties or create fake identities in order to leave positive reviews on their product or service. They may also do the same to create negative reviews on competing products and services.

=== Balance of Negative and Positive Reviews ===
Customers which have a negative experience with a product or service are more likely to offer a their review in an effort to resolve buyer's remorse in comparison to those which have had a positive experience.

=== One Side of the Story ===
Those reading reviews on products and services are likely to view reviews which only tell one side to the story. This is a disadvantage to both a potential customer and seller as the review may not tell the other side of a story which may be based on a misunderstanding.

== See also ==
- Distributed thinking
- Collective consciousness
- Participatory monitoring
- Crowdfunding
- Crowdsourcing
