= Computing with words and perceptions =

In computing with words and perceptions (CWP), the objects of computation are words, perceptions, and propositions drawn from a natural language. The central theme of CWP is the concept of a generalised constraint. The meaning of a proposition is expressed as a generalised constraint.

CWP is a necessary tool when the available information is perception-based or not precise enough to use numbers.

== See also ==
- Fuzzy set
- Lotfi Zadeh
- Perceptual computing
- Type-2 fuzzy sets and systems
