= Lotfi A. Zadeh =

Azerbaijani scientist (1921–2017)

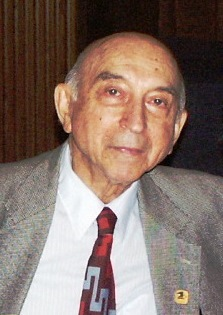
- Born: Lotfi Aliasgerzadeh; 4 February 1921; Baku, Azerbaijan Soviet Socialist Republic
- Died: 6 September 2017 (aged 96); Berkeley, California, US
- Education: University of Tehran; Massachusetts Institute of Technology; Columbia University
- Known for: Founder of fuzzy mathematics, fuzzy set theory, and fuzzy logic, Z numbers, Z-transform
- Spouse: Fay Zadeh
- Children: 2, including Norman Zada
- Awards: Eringen Medal (1976); IEEE Hamming Medal (1992); Rufus Oldenburger Medal (1993); IEEE Medal of Honor (1995); 2012 BBVA Foundation Frontiers of Knowledge Award; Honorary Doctorate of Tehran University (2016); ACM Fellow; IEEE Fellow; AAAS Fellow; AAAI Fellow; Member of the National Academy of Engineering; Founding Member of Eurasian Academy
- Scientific career
- Fields: Artificial intelligence; Computer science; Electrical engineering; Mathematics
- Workplaces: University of California, Berkeley
- Thesis: Frequency analysis of variable networks (1949)
- Doctoral advisor: John R. Ragazzini
- Doctoral students: Joseph Goguen; John Yen

Lotfi Aliasger Zadeh (/ˈzɑːdeɪ/; Azerbaijani: Lütfəli Rəhim oğlu Ələsgərzadə; Persian: لطفی علی‌عسکرزاده; Russian: Лютфали Рагим оглы Алескерзаде 4 February 1921 – 6 September 2017) was a mathematician and computer scientist, and professor of computer science at the University of California, Berkeley. Zadeh proposed fuzzy mathematics, consisting of several fuzzy-related concepts: fuzzy sets, fuzzy logic, fuzzy algorithms, fuzzy semantics, fuzzy languages, fuzzy control, fuzzy systems, fuzzy probabilities, fuzzy events, and fuzzy information. Zadeh was a founding member of the Eurasian Academy.

== Early life and career ==
=== Azerbaijan ===
Zadeh was born in Baku, Azerbaijan SSR, as Lotfi Aliasgerzadeh. His father was Rahim Aleskerzade, a Muslim, Iranian Azerbaijani journalist from Ardabil on assignment from Iran, and his mother was Fanya (Feyga) Korenman, a Jewish pediatrician from Odesa, Ukraine, who was an Iranian citizen. The Soviet government at this time courted foreign correspondents, and the family lived well while in Baku. Zadeh attended elementary school for three years there, which he said "had a significant and long-lasting influence on my thinking and my way of looking at things."

=== Iran ===
In 1931, when Stalin began agricultural collectivization, and Zadeh was ten, his father moved his family back to Tehran, Iran. Zadeh was enrolled in Alborz High School, a missionary school, where he was educated for the next eight years, and where he met his future wife, Fay (Faina) Zadeh, who said that he was "deeply influenced" by the "extremely decent, fine, honest, and helpful" Presbyterian missionaries from the United States who ran the college. "To me they represented the best that you could find in the United States—people from the Midwest with strong roots. They were really 'Good Samaritans' – willing to give of themselves for the benefit of others. So this kind of attitude influenced me deeply. It also instilled in me a deep desire to live in the United States." During this time, Zadeh was awarded several patents.

Zadeh sat for the Iran national university exams and placed third in the nation. As a student, he ranked first in his class in his first two years. In 1942, he graduated from the University of Tehran with a degree in electrical engineering, one of only three students in that field to graduate that year, due to the turmoil created by World War II, when the United States, Britain and the Soviet Union invaded Iran. Over 30,000 American soldiers were based there, and Zadeh worked with his father, who did business with them as a contractor for hardware and building materials.

=== United States ===
In 1943, Zadeh decided to leave for the United States to continue his education. He travelled to Philadelphia by way of Cairo after months of delay waiting first for the proper papers and later for the right ship to appear. He arrived in mid-1944, lived in New York and worked for an electronic association, and entered the Massachusetts Institute of Technology (MIT) as a graduate student in September that year. While in the United States, he shortened his family name, creating a new middle name from the part he removed, and was thenceforth known as Lotfi Aliasker Zadeh. He received an MS degree in electrical engineering from MIT in 1946.

In 1947, as his parents had settled in New York City, Zadeh went to work as an engineer at Columbia University. Zadeh then applied to Columbia University. Columbia admitted him as a doctoral student and offered him an instructorship as well. He received his PhD in electrical engineering from Columbia in 1949 and became an assistant professor the next year. Zadeh taught for ten years at Columbia and was promoted to full professor in 1957.

The chairman of the electronic engineering department at the University of California, wrote and offered him work. In 1959, Zadeh joined the electrical engineering faculty at the University of California, Berkeley. During his lengthy research career, Zadeh made important scientific contributions in two distinct areas: (1) linear system theory and classical control systems, and (2) fuzzy sets, fuzzy logic, and related science and technology.

Zadeh was awarded a Guggenheim Fellowship in 1967 for Natural Sciences in Applied Mathematics.

Zadeh's first important research contribution, well known among scholars of his generation in the electrical engineering community, was in the area of classical control systems. His pioneer work, co-authored with Charles Desoer, Linear System Theory: The State Space Approach, laid a critical foundation for all modern approaches to system analysis and control. The second and more well-known contribution of Zadeh's research is his lifelong dedication to the creation, enhancement and the real-world impacts of a broad collection of science and technology based on fuzzy sets and fuzzy logic. He published his seminal work on fuzzy sets in 1965, in which he described the motivation of replicating human-like reasoning and detailed the mathematics of fuzzy set theory.

In 1973 he proposed his theory of fuzzy logic. Together, fuzzy sets and fuzzy logic provide the necessary foundations for a broad class of related innovations, including (but not limited to):

- fuzzy control – a practical approach to non-linear control using fuzzy if-then rules in fuzzy logic
- fuzzy pattern recognition – a generalization of conventional pattern recognition techniques using fuzzy sets (e.g., fuzzy k-means generalizes k-means clustering)
- fuzzy database – generalizes classical database query language using fuzzy sets and fuzzy logic
- fuzzy mathematics – generalizes conventional mathematics using fuzzy sets and fuzzy logic
- neuro-fuzzy systems – a synergistic combination of fuzzy logic and neural networks, providing the first interpretable AI system based on neural network learning

He was also on the Board of Governors for International Neural Network Society (INNS) in 2003.

== Impacts to higher education ==
Zadeh became the chair of Department of Electrical Engineering at the University of California, Berkeley, in 1963. One of the lasting impacts of his leadership in this role is the expansion and the integration of computer science. He initiated and completed (in 1968) the transformation of the Electrical Engineering department at UC Berkeley to the Department of Electrical Engineering and Computer Science (EECS). This strategic move not only led UC Berkeley's advancement into the top ranks of computer science education and research, but also led other research universities globally to add computer science to their electrical engineering departments.

In 1973, Zadeh received the prestigious (Institute of Electronic and Electrical Engineers) IEEE Education Award, largely in recognition of his performance as chair of EE and then EECS. Other important services to UC Berkeley include his Academic Senate committee memberships: Academic Planning & Resource Allocation (1992–95); Committees (1969–70; 1980–81); Courses of Instruction (1975–80); and Faculty Awards (1990–92). Professor Zadeh graduated more than 50 PhD students, many of whom went on to become leaders in various areas of engineering, management and information sciences.

== Personal life ==
- Photographs
- Zadeh, at his office, with camera, 1988
- Zadeh, self-portrait
- Claude Shannon, by Zadeh
- Edgar Varese, by Zadeh
- Fay Zadeh, by Zadeh
- Fay and Lotfi, by Zadeh
- Rahim Zadeh, by Zadeh

Zadeh photographed people around him.

Zadeh was called "quick to shrug off nationalism, insisting there are much deeper issues in life", and was quoted as saying in an interview: "The question really isn't whether I'm American, Russian, Iranian, Azerbaijani, or anything else. I've been shaped by all these people and cultures, and I feel quite comfortable among all of them." He noted in the same interview: "Obstinacy and tenacity, not being afraid to get embroiled in controversy – that's very much a Turkish tradition. That's part of my character, too. I can be very stubborn. That has probably been beneficial for the development of fuzzy logic." He described himself as "an American, mathematically oriented, electrical engineer of Iranian descent, born in Russia."

He and his wife Fay Zadeh had two children, Stella and Norman Zada. His wife wrote a book, My Life and Travels with the Father of Fuzzy Logic about their travels and experiences together, visiting "exotic places" and meeting interesting people around the world.

Zadeh died in his home in Berkeley, California, on 6 September 2017, at the age of 96. He was buried at the First Alley of Honors, on 29 September 2017 in Baku, Azerbaijan, the city in which he was born. His funeral was well attended by "highly respected people." A month prior to his death, the University of Tehran had released an erroneous report that Zadeh had died, but withdrew it several days later.

== Work ==
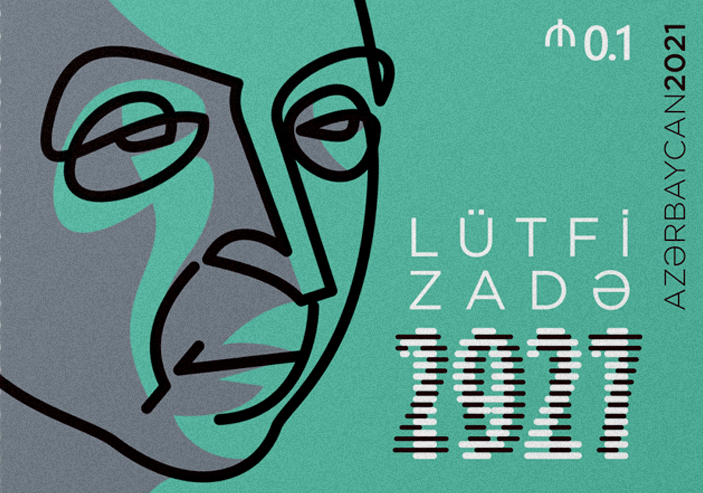
Stamp of Azerbaijan dedicated to the 100th anniversary of Lotfi A. Zadeh

According to Google Scholar, as of November 2021, Zadeh's work has been cited at least 269,091 times in scholarly works, with the 1965 Fuzzy sets paper receiving at least 122,743 citations.

=== Fuzzy sets and systems ===
Zadeh, in his theory of fuzzy sets, proposed using a membership function (with a range covering the interval [0,1]) operating on the domain of all possible values. He proposed new operations for the calculus of logic and showed that fuzzy logic was a generalisation of classical and Boolean logic. He also proposed fuzzy numbers as a special case of fuzzy sets, as well as the corresponding rules for consistent mathematical operations (fuzzy arithmetic).

=== Fuzzy logic and artificial intelligence ===
Zadeh's research career has had a lasting impact on artificial intelligence (AI). Fuzzy sets and fuzzy logic are both motivated by our understanding of human cognition: that we are comfortable with concepts that have vague boundaries. This is well aligned with the Physical symbol system assumption in AI (by Allen Newell and Herbert A. Simon), inspired by another aspect of human cognition: that humans are comfortable with concepts that are described by symbols.

The concept of a linguistic variable in fuzzy logic connects a symbol that is typically a predicate in classical logic (e.g., "John is Bold", or in predicate logic – Bold(John)) – to linguistic values (e.g., "John is somewhat bold." or in fuzzy logic – Bold(John)=Somewhat) – which generalizes the binary value of predicate logic in two ways. First, the two possible values (True or False) in predicate logic are generalized to a continuum (typically from 0, which corresponds to False, to 1, which corresponds to True). This allows the expression of Bold(John)= 0.5, which indicates that John is midway between being devoid of boldness and being entirely bold.

The second generalization enabled by fuzzy logic is to use a fuzzy set such as "somewhat bold" to describe a person's boldness level in a way that is more natural to human understanding and communication. Without this generalization, we can only describe the value of a person's boldness as a number (e.g., 0.5) or as an interval (e.g., [0.25, 0.75]). With this generalization, one can express the semantic meaning of "somewhat bold" as a fuzzy set in the domain of 0 and 1.

Zadeh was also an active contributor to the AI community, including at the Dartmouth Workshop that coined the term "artificial intelligence". He was subsequently a frequent contributor to leading AI conferences such as AAAI and IJCAI, as well as other top venues such as AI Magazine.

=== Other contributions ===
In 1952, Zadeh and his doctoral supervisor, John R. Ragazzini, published "The Analysis of Sampled-Data Systems", contributing to the mathematical analysis of sampled-data control systems. The name "z-transform" originated at Columbia University in 1952, as researchers there developed methods for analysing sampled-data systems. These methods are now used in digital signal processing, digital control, and other applications involving discrete-time systems.

He was an editor of the International Journal of Computational Cognition.

Zadeh's work also included computing with words and perceptions. His later papers include "From Search Engines to Question-Answering Systems" and "Toward a Generalized Theory of Uncertainty (GTU)—An Outline".

== Selected publications ==
A complete list of publications is available.

- — (1965). "Fuzzy sets". Information and Control. 8 (3). San Diego: 338–353. doi:10.1016/s0019-9958(65)90241-x. Zbl 0139.24606. Wikidata Q25938993.
- — (1965). "FUZZY SETS AND SYSTEMS". In Fox, Jerome (ed.). Proceedings of the Symposium on System Theory, New York, N.Y., April 20, 21, 22, 1965. Symposium on System Theory. Vol. XV. Polytechnic Institute of Brooklyn. pp. 29–39. ASIN B000L4NPSY. OCLC 1102587. OL 24217402M – via Internet Archive.
- — (1972). "A Fuzzy-Set-Theoretic Interpretation of Linguistic Hedges". Journal of Cybernetics. 2 (3): 4–34. doi:10.1080/01969727208542910. Wikidata Q109944346.
- — (1973). "Outline of a New Approach to the Analysis of Complex Systems and Decision Processes". IEEE Transactions on Systems, Man, and Cybernetics. SMC-3 (1): 28–44. doi:10.1109/tsmc.1973.5408575. Zbl 0273.93002. Wikidata Q56083455.
- — (4 December 1974). "Fuzzy Logic and Its Application to Approximate Reasoning.". In Rosenfeld, Jack L. (ed.). Information Processing, Proceedings of the 6th IFIP Congress 1974, Stockholm, Sweden, August 5-10, 1974. North-Holland Publishing. pp. 591–594. ISBN 978-0720428032. LCCN 74076063. OL 22108197M.
- — (1975). "Fuzzy logic and approximate reasoning". Synthese. 30 (3–4): 407–428. doi:10.1007/bf00485052. OCLC 714993477. S2CID 46975216. Zbl 0319.02016. Wikidata Q57275767.
- —; Fu, King-Sun; Tanaka, Kokichi; Shimura, Masamichi (1975). "Calculus of fuzzy restrictions". Fuzzy Sets and their Applications to Cognitive and Decision Processes. New York: Academic Press. pp. 1–39. doi:10.1016/C2013-0-11734-5. ISBN 978-0-12-775260-0.
- — (1975). "The concept of a linguistic variable and its application to approximate reasoning — I". Information Sciences. 8 (3): 199–249. doi:10.1016/0020-0255(75)90036-5. Zbl 0397.68071. Wikidata Q109950743.
- — (1975). "The concept of a linguistic variable and its application to approximate reasoning — II". Information Sciences. 8 (4): 301–357. doi:10.1016/0020-0255(75)90046-8. Zbl 0404.68074. Wikidata Q109951641.
- — (1975). "The concept of a linguistic variable and its application to approximate reasoning — III". Information Sciences. 9 (1): 43–80. doi:10.1016/0020-0255(75)90017-1. Zbl 0404.68075. Wikidata Q109951958.
- — (2006). "From Computing with Numbers to Computing with Words". Annals of the New York Academy of Sciences. 929 (1): 221–252. doi:10.1111/j.1749-6632.2001.tb05718.x. PMID 11357866. S2CID 60538650.
- — (12 July 2012). Computing with Words: Principal Concepts and Ideas. Studies in fuzziness and soft computing. Vol. 277 (2012 ed.). Springer-Verlag. doi:10.1007/978-3-642-27473-2. eISSN 1860-0808. ISBN 978-3-642-27472-5. ISSN 1434-9922. LCCN 2012937218. OCLC 818324681. OL 27026389M.

== Lectures ==
- 1991 - Fuzzy logic: principles, perspectives, and applications Lecture sponsored by the Dept. of Electrical and Computer engineering, University of California, San Diego. Electrical and Computer Engineering Distinguished Lecture Series. Digital Object Made Available by UC San Diego Library.

== Awards and honors ==
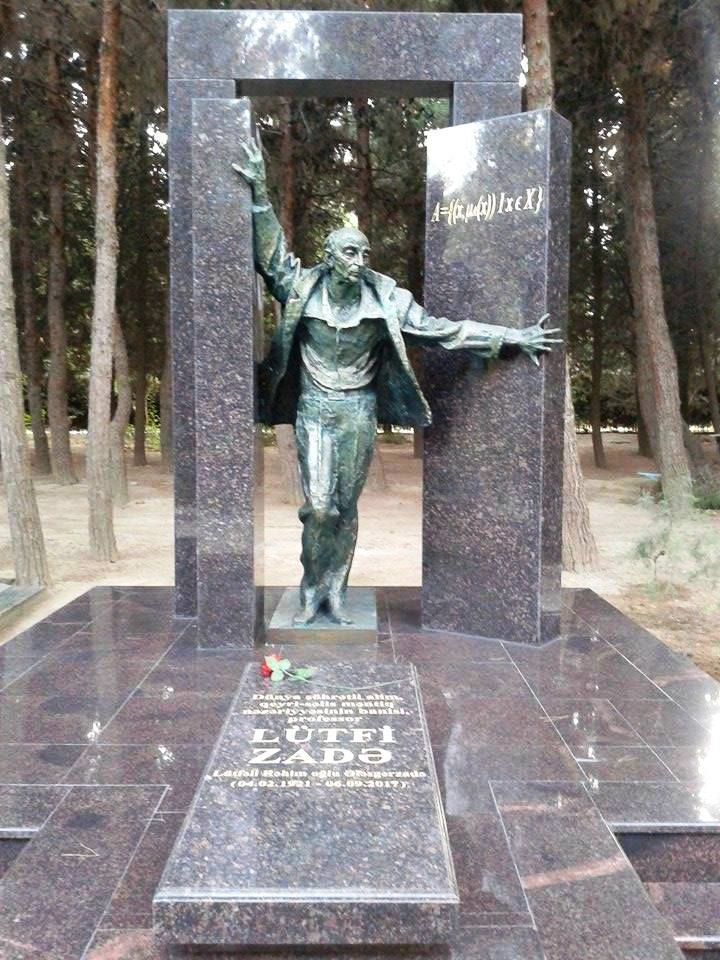
Grave of Lotfi A. Zadeh in Baku.

Zadeh was a Fellow of the Institute of Electrical and Electronics Engineers, the American Academy of Arts and Sciences, the Association for Computing Machinery, the Association for the Advancement of Artificial Intelligence and the International Fuzzy Systems Association, and a member of the National Academy of Engineering. He was also a member of the Academies of Science of Azerbaijan, Bulgaria, Finland, Korea and Poland, and of the International Academy of Systems Studies in Moscow. He received 24 honorary doctorates.

Awards received by Zadeh include, among many others:

- IEEE Education Medal; 1973
- Eringen Medal; 1976
- IEEE Richard W. Hamming Medal, for "seminal contributions to information science and systems, including the conceptualization of fuzzy sets"; 1992
- American Society of Mechanical Engineers Rufus Oldenburger Medal; 1993.
- Honorary Professorship from the Azerbaijan State Oil Academy; 1993
- IEEE Medal of Honor, for "pioneering development of fuzzy logic and its many diverse applications"; 1995
- American Automatic Control Council's Richard E. Bellman Control Heritage Award; 1998.
- ACM Allen Newell Award; 2001
- Outstanding Contribution Award, Web Intelligence Consortium (WIC), Halifax, Canada, 2003.
- Wall of Fame, Heinz Nixdorf MuseumsForum (HNF), Paderborn, Germany, 2004.
- V. Kaufmann Prize and Gold Medal, International Association for Fuzzy-Set Management and Economy (SIGEF), Barcelona, Spain, Nov. 15, 2004.
- J. Keith Brimacombe IPMM Award in recognition of his development of fuzzy set theory and fuzzy logic, 2005.
- Benjamin Franklin Medal in Electrical Engineering from The Franklin Institute in Philadelphia, for inventing and developing the field of "fuzzy logic"; 2009
- Induction into the IEEE Intelligent Systems' AI's Hall of Fame, 2011, "for his work on soft computing, fuzzy logic, and neural-net theory".
- BBVA Foundation Frontiers of Knowledge Award in the category of Information and Communication Technologies (ICT), Spain, 2012.
- Honorary Doctor of the Óbuda University (Budapest, Hungary) 2011
- Golden Goose Award, for Fuzzy Logic; 2017

== Legacy ==
In 2014, the IEEE Systems, Man, and Cybernetics Society established the "Lotfi A. Zadeh Pioneer Award", which is given to honour a person or persons with "outstanding and pioneering contributions to academic and/or industrial research in systems science and engineering, human-machine systems, and/or cybernetics." The award is funded from a $100,000 donation from Zadeh's son, Norm Zadeh, and is administered by the IEEE. Nominees must have "pioneered and developed innovative research, executed in either academe or industry," that has resulted in major scientific advances in "systems science and engineering, human-machine systems, and/or cybernetics." Contributions must have been made at least 15 years prior to the award date.

In February 2019, ADA University in Baku, Azerbaijan presented the first "Lotfi Zadeh Scholarships", which honour the academic success of undergraduate students in the university's School of IT and Engineering. Winners of the scholarship receive a complete tuition waiver for the semester or semester-equivalent in which they achieved a 4.0 average.

On 4 February 2021, the IEEE Computational Intelligence Society and the International Fuzzy Systems Association (IFSA) jointly celebrated the centenary of Zadeh's birth.

On 30 November 2021, Google honored Zadeh with a Google Doodle. His seminal paper Fuzzy sets was submitted for publication on this day in 1964.

== See also ==
- Concept of Stratification
- Fuzzy logic
- Artificial intelligence
