= Canadian Organ Replacement Registry =

Canadian medical organization

The Canadian Organ Replacement Registry (CORR) is a health organization started by Canadian nephrologists and kidney transplant surgeons in 1985 in order to develop the care of patients with kidney failure. In the early 1990s data on liver and heart transplantation were added to the registry. In 1995, CORR entered into an agreement with the Canadian Institute of Health Information to house the registry in CIHI. The board of directors of CORR receives advice from its scientific advisory committee. In recent years a research subcommittee was formed to promote research using data from the registry.

== Leadership ==
Current and past Chairs of the CORR Board of Directors are listed below:

- 1985–1992 John Jeffrey
- 1992–1999 Paul Greig
- 1999–2004 Vivian C. McAlister
- 2004–2006 Stanley Fenton
- 2006–2008 Joanne Kappel
- 2008–2010 John Gill
