= James II (record) =

EP by James
- Released: February 1985
- Recorded: October 1984
- Studio: Strawberry Studios, Stockport
- Genre: Indie pop
- Length: 5:51
- Label: Factory
- Producer: Chris Nagle

James chronology
Jimone (1983)	James II (1985)	Village Fire (1986)

James II is the second EP by James, released in February 1985 by Factory Records. It contains two tracks, which were later included on the EP Village Fire, along with the tracks from the band's debut release Jimone. It reached number 2 on the UK Independent Chart, staying on the chart for 18 weeks.

== Track listing ==
1. "Hymn from a Village" – 2:48
2. "If Things Were Perfect" – 3:03

== Personnel ==
- Tim Booth - Vocals
- Jim Glennie - Bass guitar
- Larry Gott - Lead guitar
- Gavan Whelan - Drums
