= Daniel Zeng =

American electrical engineer

Daniel Dajun Zeng (Chinese: 曾大军) is a Chinese computer scientist working in the areas of social computing, digital economic institutions, and informatics. Zeng is the former Gentile Family Professor of Management Information Systems in the Eller College of Management of the University of Arizona, and is currently affiliated with the State Key Laboratory of Multimodal Artificial Intelligence Systems in the Institute of Automation of the Chinese Academy of Sciences and the School of Artificial Intelligence of the University of the Chinese Academy of Sciences.

== Education and career ==
In 1985, Zeng earned a bachelor's degree from the University of Science and Technology of China in systems science and economic management and computer science. He then studied in the graduate school of the University of Science and Technology of China until 1992, when he took up studies at Carnegie Mellon University. He received a master's degree in industrial management at Carnegie Mellon in 1994, followed by a Ph.D. in 1998. He joined the University of Arizona as an assistant professor in the school of management in 1999, where he rose to the rank of associate professor in 2005. In 2006 he became a visiting researcher at the Institute of Automation of the Chinese Academy of Sciences, and in 2007 became a full researcher at the academy.

== Honors and awards ==
Zeng was named Fellow of the Institute of Electrical and Electronics Engineers (IEEE) in 2016, "for contributions to collaborative computing with applications to security informatics". He was named a Fellow of the American Association for the Advancement of Science in 2017.
