= Concept of Stratification =

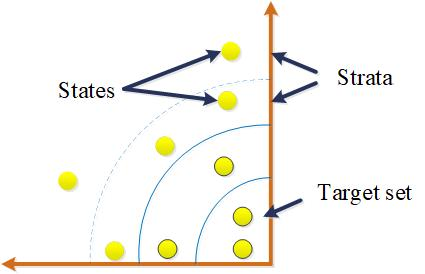
Target set, states and strata in CST

Concept of Stratification, labelled CST by Prof Lotfi A. Zadeh, was proposed in 2016. Zadeh states that it is a reform in conventional problem solving methods by the consideration of a recursive problem solving approach. Note that this concept should not be mistaken with other similar concepts such as social stratification. CST is not based on social stratification nor related to it. More particularly it is quite different from the previous versions and applications of stratification, such as stratified logic, stratified approach, stratified programming, stratified analysis, among other versions of stratification prior to 2016. This version of stratification can handle a range of problems as explained a year after the original proposal by Asadabadi and his colleagues.

The key innovation in CST is that it considers the target states first, and then the target set is gradually enlarged to include the system which is aimed to receive the target. After the system is contained in the enlarged target, the target gradually shrinks to let the system find the target. This method has similarities to the human mind problem solving and is expected to be employed widely in artificial intelligence in near future.

CST can be used to structure complicated problems. The complexity involved in many problems is with regard to the consideration of different situations that are likely to happen in the near future. These situations can be considered as different states in CST to give a general view of the problem. Through this, different aspects of the problem can be analysed separately. This is referred to in the literature as holistic and systemic thinking. The stratified multi criteria decision making method (SMCDM) proposed in 2018 is an example of such utilization.
