= Spirasi =

- Founded: 1999
- Location: 213 North Circular Road, Dublin
- Fields: Refugees, Asylum seekers, Victims of Torture
- Website: spirasi.ie

Spirasi (Spiritan Asylum Services Initiative) is the Irish national independent centre for the rehabilitation of victims of torture.

== History ==
Spirasi, the Spiritan Asylum Services Initiative, was founded in 1999 as an English language centre by the Congregation of the Holy Spirit. From 2001, the organisation began to provide victims of torture in Ireland with legal, medical, psychological, and psychosocial support. The first director of the torture-survivors' programme was Father Michael Begley.

The group's central goals are:

- Supporting victims of torture to begin their lives in Ireland
- creating models of care, develop training programmes, and fostering partnerships that benefit refugees and asylum seekers who are victims of torture
- Utilising a holistic approach to rehabilitation with integrity, compassion, respect and solidarity

Spirasi was one of the organisations which attempted to aid Ms Y as she sought an abortion in Ireland in 2013. Spirasi celebrated its 20-year anniversary with a reception at the President of Ireland's residence, Áras an Uachtaráin, on 26 March 2019.

== Core activities ==
Spirasi utilises a multidisciplinary approach for initial assessments of victims of torture or cruel, inhumane, or degrading treatment which incorporates medical, therapeutic and psychosocial elements.

They provide:

- Therapeutic interventions for victims of torture and their families
- Medical Legal Reports (MLRs)
- English language classes for victims of torture and their families

Alongside 8 other organisations, including Movement of Asylum Seekers in Ireland, Spirasi called on the Irish government to speed up the processing of vulnerable asylum seekers to get them out of direct provision centres as quickly as possible. Spirasi is one of the organisations included in the Asylum Archive, a project which documents the experiences of refugees and asylum seekers in Ireland including direct provision.
