= IEEE Systems, Man, and Cybernetics Society =

IEEE professional society focused on human-machine systems

The IEEE Systems, Man, and Cybernetics Society (IEEE SMCS) is a professional society of the IEEE. It aims "to serve the interests of its members and the community at large by promoting the theory, practice, and interdisciplinary aspects of systems science and engineering, human-machine systems, and cybernetics".

== History ==
The earliest incarnation of the IEEE Systems, Man, and Cybernetics Society was the IRE Professional Group on Human Factors in Electronics, formed in 1958. The Group would later change its name to IEEE Professional Technical Group on Human Factors in Electronics (1963), IEEE Human Factors in Electronics Group (1964), Man-Machine Systems Group (1968), Systems, Man and Cybernetics Group (1970), and finally Systems, Man and Cybernetics Society (1972).

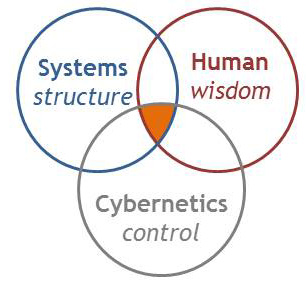
3 areas of IEEE SMC technical activities

IEEE SMCS has fostered many different technical committees which has made it a sort of technical committee “incubator.” These technical committees have addressed a number of diverse topics including, but not limited to, electrotechnology, environmental quality, national priorities, health care, decision science, optimization, learning systems, pattern recognition, and biocybernetics. A number of IEEE SMCS technical interest groups eventually became separate IEEE entities in their own right. For example, robotics and automation special interest groups merged to become the IEEE Robotics and Automation Society, and the neural network special interest group became the IEEE Neural Networks Council.

== Fields of interest ==
The Field of Interest (FoI) of the SMCS includes:

- "Integration of the theories of communication, control, cybernetics, stochastics, optimization and system structure towards the formation of a general theory of systems;"
- "Development of systems engineering technology including problem definition methods, modeling, and simulation, methods of system experimentation, human factors engineering data and methods, systems design techniques and test and evaluation methods;"
- "Application of the above at both hardware and software levels to the analysis and design of biological, ecological, socio-economic, social service, computer information, and operational man-machine systems".

Interaction among technically diverse professional colleagues is stimulating and invites new thinking that single disciplines, and employment alone, do not provide. This positions SMCS to effectively engage the emerging nature of the non-deterministic complex challenges that are typical of rapidly evolving post-industrial society.

== Technical activities ==
IEEE SMCS’s three technical areas (TA) promote initiatives in support of the FoI:

- Systems Science and Engineering—Focuses on systematics formulation, interpretation, analysis and modelling of issues and decision-making opportunities for large and complex systems.
- Human-Machine Systems—Focuses on organizational interactions, cognitive ergonomics, and human information processing.
- Cybernetics—Focuses on communication and control across machines or among machine, human and organizations. This touches a very broad area including, but not limited to, computational intelligence, computer vision, neural networks, evolutionary algorithms, fuzzy systems and machine learning.

Technical committees (TCs) in each of the technical areas offer Society members the opportunity to collaborate with colleagues on topics of mutual interest. The committees evolve in response to societal needs, member interests, and new technology opportunities. Technical committees typically bring members together from government, academia and industry from around the globe. TCs are distributed among three broad areas and a list of available TCs can be found on IEEE SMCS webpage under the following areas.

- Technical committees in Systems Science and Engineering
- Technical committees in Human-Machine systems
- Technical committees in Cybernetics

== Publications ==
IEEE SMCS previously published three peer-reviewed journals: "IEEE Transactions on Systems, Man, and Cybernetics", Part A, Part B, and Part C. Part A is devoted to systems and humans, and Part B to cybernetics . In 2012, the journals were reconfigured into the current offering.

IEEE SMCS currently publishes peer-reviewed journals relevant to SMCS goals and its FoI in the areas of systems science and engineering, human-machine systems, cybernetics and computational social systems: "IEEE Transactions on Systems, Man, and Cybernetics: Systems," "IEEE Transactions on Human-Machine Systems," "IEEE Transactions on Cybernetics", and "IEEE Transactions on Computational Social Systems."

- IEEE Transactions on Systems, Man, and Cybernetics: Systems: Topics relevant to systems engineering, accepting articles in the areas of issue formulation, analysis, modelling, decision making, and issue interpretation in all lifecycle phases for large systems. It also accepts articles addressing systems management, systems engineering processes and any method that aims to improve systems engineering methods that include optimization, modelling, and simulation.
- IEEE Transactions on Human-Machine Systems: Topics relevant to the area of human-machine systems, accepting articles covering human systems, human organizational interaction which includes cognitive ergonomics, system test and assessment, and human information processing concerns in systems and organizations.
- IEEE Transactions on Cybernetics: Computational approaches in the area of cybernetics, accepting papers on topics relevant to control and communication across machines, or machine, human and organizations. Scope includes areas utilizing different computational methods as long as they contribute to the theme of cybernetics or demonstrate an application of cybernetics principles.
- IEEE Transactions on Computational Social Systems: Modelling, simulation, analysis and understanding of social systems from a quantitative and/or computational perspective. This Transactions considers “systems” as man-man, man-machine and machine-machine organizations and adversarial situations. It accepts papers that handle modelling of the dynamics of social systems, and methodologies for computation in the domain of socio-cultural and behavior aspects of systems. Articles in the domain of social network dynamics, social intelligence and cognition, social systems design and computational behaviour modelling and their applications are also accepted.

IEEE SMCS also regularly publishes "IEEE Systems, Man, and Cybernetics Magazine" and an eNewsletter.

== Conferences ==
IEEE SMCS arranges and sponsors its flagship conference, the IEEE International Conference on Systems, Man, and Cybernetics, every year. This conference provides an international forum for researchers and practitioners to report the latest innovations and developments in the relevant fields, and exchange ideas in fields relevant to SMCS.

In addition, the Society sponsors, financially and technically, a range of annual conferences around the world that focuses on its Field of Interest. The process to obtain conference sponsorship from SMCS can be found on IEEE SMCS website.

== Chapters and communities ==
While technical committees are global in nature, IEEE SMCS also host many geographical units in the form of chapters which serve as local branches of the SMC Society. These chapters are subdivided into three main regions:

- Americas
- Europe/Africa
- Asia

== Membership ==
IEEE SMCS members enjoy exclusive membership benefits along with exclusive access to eNewsletters and notices. Details of membership can be found in IEEE SMC Membership Catalogue and membership information in IEEE SMCS.

== Distinguished Lecturer Program ==
IEEE SMCS has a Distinguished Lecturer program that allows Society Chapters (its geographical units) to learn about the latest technological developments and applications. The Society has a pool of renowned experts who can be available to deliver these lectures upon request. SMCS shares the cost of a distinguished lecture with the requesting chapter in cases where the lecturers will not receive any honorarium.

== Young Professionals ==
IEEE SMCS runs a Young Professionals Program designed to help its young members to transition from student to professional, so that the Society can serve as the technical home for recent graduates. By participating in IEEE SMCS and its sponsored conferences, young professionals can find researchers and professionals with common interests, gain peer recognition, extend their network, and discover collaborative opportunities. These early involvements can help young professionals to build a successful career.

== Women in Engineering ==
IEEE SMCS places special emphasis on the promotion of female engineers and scientists within its FoI. The Society’s Board of Governors established its liaison to the IEEE Women in Engineering organization to inspire, engage and advance women in Systems, Man, and Cybernetics. The WIE–SMCS committee organizes a series of periodic events and activities to promote the visibility of women leaders and to inspire young girls who want to get involved in engineering.
