= Center for Survivors of Torture =

- Abbreviation: CST
- Formation: 1997
- Type: Non-profit 501(c)(3) organization
- Purpose: Rehabilitating international torture survivors
- Headquarters: Dallas, TX
- Region served: Global
- Official language: English

Center for Survivors of Torture (CST) is a non-profit 501(c)(3) organization founded in Dallas, Texas with an office in Austin, Texas. CST was founded in 1997 with the mission of rehabilitating international torture survivors through counseling, medical, legal, and social services.

== History ==
CST has helped more than 1,850 torture survivors, refugees, human trafficking victims, and asylum seekers from more than 65 countries in both Texas and Oklahoma. In 2012, CST Dallas alone helped more than 550 survivors from more than 70 countries. It is the only active organization in the southwest United States that is licensed in international torture treatment.

== Services ==
CST's services include mental health counseling, forensic legal and medical reports, medical and legal services and referrals, community outreach and education, food, clothing, transportation, English practice and tutoring, mentoring, acculturation, social events, art therapy, computer and internet access, and employment assistance and preparation.

== Efficacy ==
Clients who receive services from CST regularly for at least three months report a significant decrease in symptoms. Clients are better able to eat, sleep, and function normally and live contentedly and securely. Asylum seekers are able to participate in their legal cases, thereby more likely able to obtain asylum.

== Client demographics ==
CST clients come from more than 65 different countries from several different regions, including Africa, the Middle East, Central and South America, Eastern Europe, and Southeast Asia.

Clients tend to be highly educated and presented strong leadership in democratic movements in their home countries.

Severity and duration of client reactions and treatments vary greatly depending on what each individual client experienced in their home country.

== Accreditation and affiliations ==
- International Rehabilitation Council for Torture Treatment
- National Consortium of Torture Treatment Programs, founder
- Program Development Committee and Inter-agency Committee of the Texas Consortium of Refugee Program
- Physicians for Human Rights, member (Alejandro Moreno, CST's Legal & Medical Director)
