= Chain Mail (song) =

1986 single by James

"Chain Mail"/"Sit Down"

Single by James
- Released: March 1986
- Recorded: Crescent Studios, Bath
- Genre: Folk
- Label: Sire

James singles chronology
"Chain Mail"/"Sit Down" (1986)	"So Many Ways" (1986)

"Chain Mail" is a song by Mancunian band James, released in March 1986 by Sire Records, the first after the band defected from Factory Records. The record is the band's first single after their first three EPs, and was released in two different versions, as 7-inch and 12-inch singles, with different artworks by John Carroll and, confusingly, under different names. The 12" version was released as "Sit Down, three songs by... James", even though it did not contain the later James hit, "Sit Down", which in 1986 had not been written yet. The only difference between the two versions musically was the inclusion of the song "Uprising" on the 12" version. Neither song made it onto James's debut album, Stutter, although live versions of "Chain Mail" and "Hup-Springs" were later included in the live album One Man Clapping.

== Band lineup ==
- Tim Booth - vocals
- Jim Glennie - bass guitar
- Larry Gott - lead guitar
- Gavan Whelan - drums

== Track listings ==
7-inch single

1. "Chain Mail"
2. "Hup-Springs"

12" EP

1. "Chain Mail"
2. "Uprising"
3. "Hup-Springs"
