= La Petite Mort (James album) =

Studio album by James
- Released: 2 June 2014
- Recorded: July 2013
- Studios: RAK, London
- Genre: Alternative rock
- Length: 45:21
- Labels: BMG, Cooking Vinyl
- Producers: Max Dingel, Larry Gott

James chronology
The Morning After (2010)	La Petite Mort (2014)	Girl at the End of the World (2016)

Singles from La Petite Mort
- 1. "Moving On" Released: 28 April 2014; 2. "Curse Curse" Released: 25 August 2014; 3. "All I'm Saying" Released: 17 November 2014

La Petite Mort is the 13th studio album by British rock band James. Throughout 2012 and 2013, the band worked on a follow-up to the 2010 mini-albums The Night Before and The Morning After. After contacting producer Max Dingel, they began recording at RAK Studios in London. Preceding the album, "Moving On" was released as a single in April 2014, with La Petite Mort appearing in June through BMG and Cooking Vinyl. Coinciding with this, the band played various festivals across Europe, though some were cancelled due to Booth losing his voice. "All I'm Saying" was released as a single in November, as the band was on a UK tour.

The tracks on La Petite Mort were influenced by the deaths of frontman Tim Booth's mother and his best friend Gabrielle Roth. It included more pianos and keyboards, drawing comparison to Elbow and Coldplay, with some of the guitar parts were compared to Muse. The album reached number 11 in the UK and number 22 in Portugal. It received a mainly favourable response from music critics, with comments on the production and its upbeat sound. The music videos for "Moving On" and "All I'm Saying" were nominated for various awards, with the latter winning one for Best Picture.

== Background ==
In 2010, James released a pair of mini-albums, The Night Before and The Morning After. Working with the producer of those two releases, frontman Tim Booth released a solo album Love Life in early 2011. He went on tour to promote it, alongside James bandmate Saul Davies. James embarked on a UK tour later in the same year with Orchestra of the Swan and the Manchester Consort Choir as the group's backing ensemble. Booth's mother died in 2012; within months, the band began writing new songs. A career-spanning boxset entitled The Gathering Sound appeared in late 2012, complete with all of their studio albums, a variety of B-sides and unreleased material.

The release of the box set, coupled with the two mini-albums, marked the end of the group's recording contract with major label Mercury Records. Additionally, contracts with various music publishers had ended around this time; the publishers had no interest in continuing the contracts, a view that the members also shared. The group soon signed a publishing deal with BMG. Between June and November 2012, Booth, bassist Jim Glennie and guitarist Larry Gott spent time in Portugal (Porto), Greece (Athens) and the UK (Manchester and Scottish Highlands) writing new material. While in the Scottish Highlands, they set up a studio in a small hotel in Gairloch and recorded demos. Booth said the writing this time was opened to Davies and keyboardist Mark Hunter, which he felt have the material a "more organic" sound. They accumulated 30 to 40 songs in total for their next album, in contrast to the 120 they had for their tenth studio album Hey Ma (2008).

== Production ==
James wanted a producer that would take them to a different sonic soundscape, eventually finding Max Dingel from his work with Alt-J, the Killers and Glasvegas. In early 2013, Dingel had a conference call with the band, discussing the possibility of working together. He had heard the demos they had and was "really impressed" with them; they first went into a studio in London in March to work on two tracks, "Moving On" and "Gone Baby Gone". As the session went down well, the group proposed to him to produce their next record. In April that year, the group embarked on UK tour to promote The Gathering Sound box set. Prior to this trek, the group spent a few days at the Tolbooth in Stirling writing more material.

Amidst a series of festival appearances, recording for La Petite Mort took place at RAK Studios in London in July 2013 with Dingel producing. Booth said javing the sessions at RAK allowed them to have all "sort[s] of technology at our disposal", in contrast to the make-shift studio they used for Hey Ma. Dingel and Mike Spin served as the main engineers, with secondary engineers Isabel Seeliger Morley and Helen Atkinson (the latter pair also operated the Pro-Tools software). Gott produced and mixed "Bitter Virtue", with Hunter handling recording and programming. The band (minus Baynton-Power) sung all of the backing vocals with the aid of coach Larion Stolk. Dingel contributed electronic drums. Dingel mixed the recordings, sans "Bitter Virtue", at Mothership Music in February 2014, before they were mastered by Dick Beetham at 360 Mastering.

== Composition ==
=== Overview ===
The album's title La Petite Mort is taken from "Frozen Britain", and draws from its overall themes of death and release; and translates to orgasm in French. When originally coming up with the title, the band knew they wanted it to reference death in a joyful manner. The songs were influenced by the death of Booth's mother, as well as the death of his best friend Gabrielle Roth, which he said acted as "opposite extreme experiences" that "made it so interesting." Booth spent two days with his mother, before she died in his arms. For Roth, Booth flew to New York City in an attempt to say goodbye, but was unable to see her before she died.

All of the songs that appear on the album were written by Booth, Gott, Glennie, Davies and Hunter, with lyrics by Booth. A significant portion of Booth's lyrics come to him when he's sleeping, or come up with just after waking up. He theorised that the two deaths gave him "fuel and drive" that allowed him to "write from a deep place without even thinking about it." In the past, the band were unable to hear Hunter while working in a room together. For La Petite Mort, they purposely turned up the sound of his keyboard; as a result, the album features more keyboard and piano parts than any of their past records. The album overall was compared to Elbow and Coldplay, with some of the space rock-esque guitar riffs being reminiscent of Muse.

=== Tracks ===
"Walk Like You" is a seven-minute long track that was edited from an hour-and-20-minute long jam session. It is partially a tribute to Roth, who previously worked as a dance teacher. Booth said the bridge section was her "philosophy in many ways." The rest of the track is about teenage discrimination, and a warning to children to not make the same mistakes as their parents. The song's structure of building to a crescendo, before shifting into a quiet section with repetitive lyrics that also build recalled "English Beefcake" from the group's Pleased to Meet You (2001) album. "Curse Curse" uses an EDM backing track, and was compared to one of their earlier songs "Laid" in the way it detailed sexual experiences. Booth directly addressed his mother's death in "Moving On", though the chorus had been written before that event. It opens with a loop section done by Davies and Dingel, which Booth likened to funeral bells. The track was compared to British Sea Power, while during the chorus Booth channelled James Dean Bradfield of Manic Street Preachers.

"Gone Baby Gone" is a bass-driven electronic track that sees Booth discuss the choice between a stable relationship or freedom of being single. Davies compared it to the title-track from the band's Gold Mother (1990) album with its loop-based structure and drum machine. "Frozen Britain" is a guitar pop track where Booth's vocal during the hook was compared to Robert Smith of the Cure. It features the lyric "make a boy out of me", which is a turn-of-phrase on the line "make a man out of me". Booth explained it was from the viewpoint of an old man talking to a woman he falls in love with, asking for rebirth. Davies came up with the track's guitar riff; he and Glennie said the song was reminiscent of Editors. Discussing "Interrogation", Davies said the band worked on a demo of it at Glennie's house, which consisted of two separate pieces of music joined together. Booth said it was a realisation of things that he judged about others, he concealed about himself.

"Bitter Virtue" consists of a guitar and drum machine, and sees Booth sing in a cabaret manner. Discussing the lyrics, Booth said the difference between living and loving was typically ego. "All in My Mind" is a power ballad; it talks about how remembering deceased partners can keep their memory alive. Glennie said the music consisted of different lengths of bars. "Quicken the Dead" grew out of a jam and was further worked on at Hunter's home studio in London. "All I'm Saying" was written when Booth was being visited by Roth in his dreams, weeks after her death. It mixed dance elements heard throughout the rest of the album with the group's inclination for rock ballads. "Whistleblowers" is a tribute to whistleblowers Chelsea Manning and Edward Snowden. Booth said the pair were "doing a public service for people and exposing what's going on in governments, and yet they become outcasts." Booth was friends with some whistleblowers and was seeing how they lost their friends; the theme subsequently found its way into the song.

== Release ==
On 19 February 2014, the band announced they had signed to BMG and Cooking Vinyl to release their next album. Five days later, La Petite Mort was announced for released in June. Alongside this, "Frozen Britain" was included in pre-orders as an instant grat track. On 27 February, a music video was released for "Frozen Britain", directed by Roger Sargent. On 6 March, the group appeared on BBC 6 Music, where they played "Frozen Britain". "Interrogation" was made available for free download to people that signed up to the group's mailing list on 21 April. The following day, "Moving On" premiered on BBC Radio 2, before being released as a single on 28 April. An animated stop-motion video for the track, done by director Ainslie Henderson, premiered on Vevo on 5 May. The group had a number of treatments for the video, none of which they were happy with, including one from Henderson. After realising who he was, Booth had an hour-long phone call with him about the song and its meaning. Following this, he came up with the final treatment after seeing a ball of wool in a shop window. The band appeared on BBC Radio 2 on 22 May, where they played "Moving On". La Petite Mort was released on 2 June; its artwork featured a human skull, stylised in the vein of Day of the Dead. Booth had suggested the concept, but did not want to solely "present a Western view of death," sending some skulls to an artist, who in turn sent the final cover. The iTunes version included "Whistleblowers" as a bonus track.

To promote the album's release, the group did an in-store acoustic performance in Manchester. Between June and August, the band played festivals through the UK, Norway, Spain, Portugal, Germany, Greece and Italy, including a headlining spot at the Summer in the City festival in Manchester. The group were forced to cancel some of the appearances when Booth lost his voice. As a result, he had to seek help, which in turn led to him receiving singing lessons. On 25 August, "Curse Curse" was released as single; the following day, a music video was released for it, directed by Alberto Almeida. La Petite Mort was released on 16 September in the US; a one-off show in that territory was held in New York City. On 31 October, the stop-motion music video for "All I'm Saying" premiered through The Quietus's website, directed by Péter Vácz. In November, the group embarked on UK tour with support from Starsailor. Coinciding with it, "All I'm Saying" was released as a single on 17 November with the extra track "Let Us Die". On 22 November, the group appeared CBS This Morning performing "Moving On" and "Curse Curse". In April 2015, the band participated in the 2015 Record Store Day with Curse Curse Remixes a 12" vinyl record of "Curse Curse" remixes, which were hand-picked by the band as part of a competition with DJ Mag the previous year.

== Reception ==
Professional ratings
Aggregate scores
Source	Rating
Metacritic	67/100
Review scores
Source	Rating
AllMusic	4/5 stars
The Independent	3/5
musicOMH	3.5/5 stars
PopMatters	6/10
Q	3/5 stars
QRO	7.7/10
Spectrum Culture	3.5/5 stars
The Times	2/5 stars
Under the Radar	6.5/10 stars
Virgin Media	3/5 stars

La Petite Mort received generally positive reviews from music critics, according to review aggregator Metacritic. AllMusic reviewer Timothy Monger said the group offered one of their "more moving and personal records", full of "colorful new songs that sound more inspired than sad." He called it a "quality release and a welcome return" for the group. Spectrum Culture writer Michael Merline found it "frequently joyful, exuberant and energetic" instead of "morose or even overly contemplative." Andy Walsh of Renowned for Sound said it was a "solid effort ... [f]or the most part, the writing is focused, the production is polished and Booth's vocals standout in a manner we are used to hearing." PopMatters' John Garratt wrote that "experimentation is kept to a minimum as the band concentrates on swinging for the fences." musicOMH writer Graeme Marsh said it was "probably better than expected", since it was bookended by "two (almost) James classics", though at times the "production strips away the potential majesty."

Mack Hayden of Under the Radar wrote that the group "maintain[ed] their identity even when trying on or shaking off new clothes" when experimenting with different sounds. Though Hayden said it "may not be a groundbreaker ... it's definitely a treat." QRO editor Ted Chase felt that it got a "little too ‘up with people’ at times [...] but there are also pieces where the group strips down" successfully, such as in "Interrogation" and "Gone Baby Gone". Virgin Media reviewer Ian Gittins found that "after nearly 30 years, the idiosyncratic, quixotic James are always worth persevering with", but criticized the second half of the record as being the group at "their most morose and maudlin." The Times' Anna Conrad disliked the group's foray "into dubious experimental territory." Adding that, the "floors are now scrubbed clean, but what's left behind is almost unrecognisable."

La Petite Mort reached number 11 on the UK album chart. Outside of the UK, it reached number 22 in Portugal. "Moving On" reached number 35 on the Mexico Ingles Airplay chart. The music video for the track was nominated for Video of the Year award at the 2014 AIM Independent Music Awards, Best Rock/Indie Video and Best Animation in a Video awards at the 2014 UK Music Video Awards. The video for "All I'm Saying" was nominated for the Best Music Video award at the 2015 Sehsüchte Film Festival, and the Best Animation award at the 2015 Berlin Music Video Awards. It won the Best Picture award at the 2015 We Like 'Em Short Film Festival. Clash included "Moving On" on their list of the top 10 best James songs.

== Track listing ==
All songs written by Tim Booth, Larry Gott, Jim Glennie, Saul Davies and Mark Hunter. All lyrics by Booth.

1. "Walk Like You" – 7:07
2. "Curse Curse" – 4:29
3. "Moving On" – 4:44
4. "Gone Baby Gone" – 5:13
5. "Frozen Britain" – 3:25
6. "Interrogation" – 5:57
7. "Bitter Virtue" – 3:45
8. "All in My Mind" – 3:38
9. "Quicken the Dead" – 2:38
10. "All I'm Saying" – 4:58

iTunes bonus track

11. "Whistleblowers" – 3:34

== Personnel ==
Personnel per booklet.

James

- Tim Booth – lead vocals, backing vocals
- Larry Gott – guitar, backing vocals
- Jim Glennie – bass guitar, backing vocals
- Saul Davies – guitar, drums, percussion, violin, backing vocals
- Mark Hunter – keyboards, backing vocals, programming (track 7)
- David Baynton-Power – drums
- Andy Diagram – trumpet, backing vocals

Additional musicians

- Larion Stolk – backing vocal coaching, backing vocals
- Max Dingel – electronic drums

Production

- Max Dingel – producer (all except track 7), mixing (all except track 7), engineer
- Mike Spink – engineer
- Isabel Seeliger Morley – second engineer, Pro-Tools
- Helen Atkinson – second engineer, Pro-Tools
- Larry Gott – producer (track 7), mixing (track 7)
- Mark Hunter – recording (track 7)
- Dick Beetham – mastering
- Roger Sargent – band photography
- Minerva Bloom – front cover skull photography
- Luke Insect Studio – artwork

== Charts ==
Chart (2014)	Peak position
Portuguese Albums (AFP)	22
UK Albums (Official Charts)	11
