= Living in Extraordinary Times =

Album by James

Studio album by James
- Released: 3 August 2018
- Recorded: October–December 2017
- Studio: Livingston; Iguana, London
- Genre: Indie rock
- Length: 57:11
- Label: Infectious Music
- Producer: Charlie Andrew; Beni Giles

James chronology
Girl at the End of the World (2016)	Living in Extraordinary Times (2018)	All the Colours of You (2021)

Singles from Living in Extraordinary Times
- 1. "Hank" Released: 16 May 2018; 2. "Many Faces" Released: 25 July 2018

Living in Extraordinary Times is the 15th studio album by British rock band James. It was released on 3 August 2018, through Infectious Music. A few months after the release of the band's 14th studio album, Girl at the End of the World in 2016, work began on a new album. Writing and three weeks of jam sessions followed, with engineer Beni Giles appearing partway through the sessions. Recording took place at Livingston and Iguana studios, both of which are in London, and lasted for four weeks, with Giles and Charlie Andrew handling co-production. Described as an indie rock record with elements of electronica, the album drew comparisons with the music of U2, the Killers, and the Courteeners. The music incorporates grooves, which were aided by bassist Jim Glennie, drummer David Baynton-Power, Andrew, and Giles.

Living in Extraordinary Times received generally positive reviews from music critics, some of whom noted James' attempt to challenge listeners' expectations. It peaked at number six in the United Kingdom, while also charting in Belgium and Portugal. "Hank" was released as the lead single in May 2018, and was followed by a tour of the UK. The second single "Many Faces" was released in July of that year amid a series of festival performances. Continuous touring for the album, which consisted of both headlining tours and festival appearances, saw the band play shows across Australia, New Zealand, South Africa, Europe and the United States, including co-headlining tours with the Charlatans and the Psychedelic Furs.

== Background and development ==
James released their 14th studio album Girl at the End of the World through BMG in March 2016. In June and September of that year, the band began writing songs for their next album at Yellow Arch Studios in Sheffield. Following a tour across the United Kingdom in December 2016, James returned to Sheffield to edit existing material, and write new songs. Pre-production took place in July 2017 at Yellow Arch with vocalist Tim Booth, bassist Jim Glennie, multi-instrumentalist Saul Davies, and keyboardist Mark Hunter. The process consisted of three weeks of jam sessions, and wrote new material together with a drum machine. The band wanted to continue with the drum experimentation they had been doing on their 13th studio album La Petite Mort (2014) and Girl at the End of the World, on which they use less organic-sounding drums.

James spent six hours per day jamming on ideas for songs across six or seven jam sessions – all of which they recorded. The band intended to go back to the jams and shape them into song structures. After Booth wrote lyrics, James planned to work with a producer who could bring another perspective to the material. Booth brought in engineer Beni Giles during the second week of pre-production to help record the jams. When he was writing "Heads", Booth asked Giles to alter the drums; the latter was initially hesitant as he said he was producer and not an editor. Giles came up with a part Booth really liked, and as a result of this, the band kept inviting Giles to the jam sessions. James accumulated over 100 jam recordings, and took around 10 of them home to continue working on. Trumpeter Andy Diagram was invited to join Booth in Los Angeles, California, where they edited some of the jams.

== Production ==
Booth was in contact with Charlie Andrew after he produced Alt-J's debut studio album An Awesome Wave (2012). Booth said its crisp sound reminded him of Radiohead's OK Computer (1997), and he decided he wanted to work with Andrew. Andrew agreed to record with James after he saw them perform live, and he was introduced to Giles. Glennie said they had attempted to work with Andrew for the previous three studio albums. Living in Extraordinary Times was recorded at Livingston Studio rooms 1 & 2 and Iguana Studios, both of which are located in London, with Andrew and Giles serving as producers. Engineers Dan Moyler and Billy Halliday handled recording, with assistance from Tom Archer and Henri Davis.

Booth said Andrew and Giles reminded James of their prior collaborations with Brian Eno, with the unpredictable nature of the sessions. Booth recorded the ending vocal part of "What's It All About" while walking around London's Wood Green district with Giles, who handled the microphone. The band eventually ran out of money as well as time to work on additional tracks; Booth had wished to make a double album, but their label halted plans for one. Recording lasted four consecutive weeks from October to November 2017, before Booth flew back to the United States. He returned in December and finished the vocals, prior to a show in Manchester. Andrew and Giles mixed the recordings with assistance from Jay Pocknell and Katie Earl, and the recordings were mastered by Dick Beetham.

== Composition and lyrics ==
=== Overview ===
There’s this polarization in [the United States] going on, between this small-minded narrative of, 'me, me, me – my country, my career, make America white again,' and the more expansive, inclusive consciousness of, 'We are all one.'

— Tim Booth on the album's title

The album's title, Living in Extraordinary Times, refers to political and social movements that are intertwined in ways people are unable to comprehend, such as Brexit, Me Too and Black Lives Matter. Booth often wrote what he felt were his best lyrics in the early hours of the morning. He would wake up at 4AM, and be unable to go back to sleep because he had a line in his head. Writing the line down spurred Booth to write more lyrics without putting much thought into them. Further lyrical inspiration was drawn from the works of Yuval Noah Harari, David Mitchell, and Michael Pollan. Donald Trump was initially a dominant theme on the album; Booth lives in Topanga Canyon, California, and witnessed Trump become president. The Trump material was later pared down to a few references on some of the tracks, including "Hank" and "Many Faces".

Living in Extraordinary Times has been described as an indie rock release, incorporating elements of the music of U2, Underworld, Interpol, the Killers, the Courteeners, and Keane. All of the songs on the album were credited to Booth, Glennie, Davies and Hunter, with the exception of "Coming Home (Pt.2)", which was credited to the four of them and former member Larry Gott. A few years previously, Glennie started playing what Booth called "sexy" grooves, which made their way into new material. Encouraged by Booth's love of grooves during a song, drummer David Baynton-Power incorporated them into the songs. The grooves were aided by a collaboration with Andrew and Giles, both of whom were drummers and suggested a number of rhythmic ideas.

Electronica elements, which Booth said came from a passion for "slightly off kilter" rhythms, are heard throughout Living in Extraordinary Times. Eno, Andrew and Giles configured synth programming while Andrew and Giles handled additional drum programming. Additional programming was done by Rick Webster. Percussion was performed by Andrew, Giles, Peter Robertson, Early, Archer and Adam Betts, with additional percussion from Davis and congas from Andrew. Andrew and Giles played bells; the latter also contributing Moog bass, harmonium and lead guitar. Andrew, Giles, Betts and Robertson played drums. Andrew and Giles arranged the horns, which were performed by Mark Brown (saxophone), Pat Hartley (trombone) and Trevor Mires (trombone and bass trombone). Webster sang backing vocals alongside Larion Stolk and touring member Ron Yeadon. Josephine Stephenson, Kate Huggett and Sarah Latto comprised the choir.

=== Tracks ===
"Hank" recalls the music of Depeche Mode, and sees Booth discussing the negative aspects of the modern-day US. It integrates the technique of the Kodō, a taiko drumming troupe, which was inspired by the tapping of Giles' fingers on a table. "Coming Home (Pt.2)" is written from the perspective of a father who is absent from his offspring. Its title is a reference to one of James' earlier songs "Come Home" (1989); the music recalls the sound of their fourth studio album Seven (1992). Though "Come Home" is centred around Booth's separation from the mother of his older son, the sequel deals with being on tour, and missing Father's Day and birthdays of his second son. The band first worked on the song during the Girl at the End of the World sessions but could not finish it at the time. "Coming Home (Pt.2)" opens with an arpeggiated keyboard part from Eno, which Giles said gives the track a different feeling.

"Leviathan" began as two jams, one of which had a decent chorus and average verse, while the other had a good verse section and an as not as strong chorus. Andrew went on holiday and telephoned Giles, telling him to edit the jams together and change the key. Andrew and Giles visited several London studios in an attempt to find a specific keyboard sound, which they found at Urchin Studios. The song talks about "hitting a wall" before suddenly moving on to another part of one's life. "Leviathan" opens with a keyboard line before shifting into techno music. "Heads" is about fake news; it starts with drums and a synthesizer part, after which the bass is heard and the track builds up to up-tempo percussion and electronic horns, ending in a bass breakdown. Andrew and Giles brought in percussionists to enhance the track.

The folk track "Many Faces" makes reference to H. P. Lovecraft and Trump, and celebrates the differences between people. It was written in response to Trump's decision to build a border wall. The track starts with an acoustic guitar and a Mariachi-style trumpet part that builds up to the line, "There's only one human race, many faces, everyone belongs here." Booth makes namechecks a canary in the song, which refers to the bird's use as a warning system in a mineshaft. Andrew and Giles later added in a choir section to it. The slow-tempo folk track "How Hard the Day" revolves around single-note guitar lines and focuses on the vocal melody. The introduction to "Extraordinary Times" recalls "How Soon Is Now?" (1985) by the Smiths, and has a drum sound that is similar to that of "Paradise City" (1989) by Guns N' Roses. The track, which is about living in the moment, ends abruptly, with Diagram saying the ending serves as "a shock ... sort of represents you never know when the end is coming."

Booth wanted Diagram to add a "wild & uncontrolled" trumpet section at the end of "Picture of This Place", and sung placeholder words on the demo version to indicate where he wanted the trumpet to be played. Diagram liked the placeholder parts and simply played along with them. Discussing the origins of "Better Than That", Booth said he was in the middle of paddleboarding against 6-foot (1.8 m)-high waves, and after being repeatedly struck by the waves, he was exclaiming; "Come on, you can do better than that." James did not want to play the track to their management or record label because they felt it was "too safe." Giles edited the track; he removed some of the hooks, added backwards reverb and changed the rhythm section. The song talks about moving forward in life despite difficult challenges, some of which help one's development.

"Mask" is the song on Living in Extraordinary Times most reminiscent of Girl at the End of the World, centring around a keyboard part, and incorporating acoustic guitar. The song was originally tried during the sessions for Girl at the End of the World but remained unfinished at the time. "What's It All About" was edited down from an hour's worth of jam sessions into seven minutes; Booth said the final version lasted that long because he wanted to work on a lot of different parts. Some of the song's lyrics were influenced by ceremonies Booth took part in with two shamans, and includes a reference to El Dorado. Booth called "Backwards Glances" a "[p]arting of the waves song." "Moving Car" was compared to the darker-sounding parts of the band's fifth studio album Laid (1993). "Overdose" is an early iteration of "Extraordinary Times", which Diagram referred to as "a good example of how James songs are never fixed & always developing." It is a 4-minute snippet of a full jam recording that lasted 45 minutes. "Trouble" is one of the tracks Diagram and Booth worked on in Los Angeles; it was edited together from two jams.

== Release and promotion ==
"Better Than That" premiered through BBC Radio 6 on 3 April 2018, alongside details of the band's EP of the same title. The EP came about because James did not want to put all 15 tracks they recorded on their forthcoming album. The rest of the EP was made available for streaming between 4 April and 16 May 2018, leading up to the May release. On 16 May, the release of Living in Extraordinary Times was announced for August 2018. In addition, "Hank" was released as the album's lead single. Two days later, Better Than That was released; two of its tracks that would later appear on Living in Extraordinary Times ("Better Than That" and "Hank"), while the other two ("Busted" and "Broken by the Hurt") did not. A lyric video was released for "Hank" on 21 May 2018. "Coming Home (Pt.2)" was debuted on BBC Radio 2; its music video, which was directed by Leif Tilden, premiered through Clash's website. Booth would FaceTime his son in order to get himself in the right frame of mind during filming; they shot nine takes in total. While the video was in the editing phase, Booth suggested to Tilden that the video should pause partway through the clip, making viewers think their computers had frozen, which ended up in the final version. Booth had wanted to create an animated video, though this idea was scrapped for monetary reasons.

"Many Faces" was released as the second single from Living in Extraordinary Times on 25 July 2018; the single edit brings the chorus section forward to an earlier place in the track. Living in Extraordinary Times was released on 3 August 2018, through BMG-imprint Infectious Music; the deluxe edition includes an extra track "Backwards Glances", and the demos "Moving Car", "Overdose", and "Trouble". James did not want the album's cover artwork to represent negativity in contrast with the uplifting nature of the music, and as a result they chose and rejected several artworks. Their manager came across the work of artist Magnus Gjoen, who was chosen to produce the final cover art. The cover image depicts a hand grenade from which roses are growing; according to Booth this signals hope for the future. An acoustic version of "Many Faces" was released on 10 October 2018. Live in Extraordinary Times, the band's fourth live album and fifth video album, was released in December 2020.

== Touring ==
In May 2018, James went on a brief UK tour, with support from Lanterns on the Lake. They were accompanied by touring member Deborah Knox-Hewson, who had replaced Yeadon after he left James in late 2017. On 5 June 2018, James appeared on Later... with Jools Holland, where they played "Better Than That", "Coming Home (Pt.2)" and "Many Faces". Between late June and August, James played at and headlined various festivals in the UK, Portugal, and Spain. To promote the release of Living in Extraordinary Times, James played some radio sessions, and did an acoustic, in-store performance. Knox-Hewson left the band to work for Netflix, and was replaced at her suggestion with Chloe Alpher.

In November 2018, the band toured Australia, New Zealand, and South Africa, before embarking on a co-headlining UK arena tour with the Charlatans in the following month. In March 2019, James embarked on another UK tour; instead of having a support act, the band played an extra acoustic set before their shows. Following the tour, they toured in Portugal. In June 2019, James played at the Isle of Wight Festival, and supported the Courteeners. In July and August, James went on a co-headlining US tour with the Psychedelic Furs and were supported by Dear Boy. Before and after their US tour, James played at festivals in Greece, Italy, France, the UK, Spain, and Portugal, which ran into September 2019.

== Reception ==
Professional ratings
Aggregate scores
Source	Rating
AnyDecentMusic?	6.7/10
Metacritic	75/100
Review scores
Source	Rating
AllMusic	3.5/5 stars
Express & Star	8/10
Financial Times	3/5 stars
The Independent	4/5 stars
Louder Than War	8/10
The Observer	4/5 stars
PopMatters	8/10
The Skinny	3/5 stars
The Times	3/5 stars
Under the Radar	7/10 stars

Living in Extraordinary Times was met with generally favourable reviews from music critics. At Metacritic, which assigns a normalized rating out of 100 to reviews from mainstream publications, the album received an average score of 75, based on 9 reviews. AnyDecentMusic? gave it a score of 6.7, based on 12 reviews.

The Independent writer Jack Shepherd said James "still work[ed] at their full capacity, bringing new ideas and sounds while retaining what inherently makes James James." Express & Star's Leigh Sanders called Living in Extraordinary Times a "wonderful" release that is complete with "thumping percussion, [and] witty lyrics," and said although it is "perhaps a tad long," the album deserves to be "heard from start to finish." In a review for Louder Than War, Martin Unsworth called it a "challenging album" that could "divide hard-core fans but will certainly stand the test of time." The Observer editor Damien Morris was impressed the band showed capability of "still writing songs that swing for the furthest festival fences."

PopMatters writer Ed Whitelock referred to Living in Extraordinary Times as an "extraordinary" record that sees James "firing on all cylinders." He said Glennie and Baynton-Power act as a "criminally underappreciated rhythm section ... [a] foundation that, if removed, would render all else to rubble." Aug Stone of Under the Radar said James "continue to play with our expectations both sonically and melodically ... taking chances that pay off most of the time." According to AllMusic reviewer Stephen Thomas Erlewine, the album is "a little exhausting for those who aren't true believers" but it can "prove to be fascinating for the dedicated sort who choose immersion over skimming." Financial Times writer Ludovic Hunter-Tilney wrote the album is a "bit overripe at times," though called the music mainly "sinewy and sleek indie-rock, a vibrant statement of continuing intent."

Living in Extraordinary Times peaked at number six on the UK Albums Chart. It also reached number 29 on the Billboard Independent Albums chart in the US, number 38 in Portugal, and number 172 in the Flanders region of Belgium. By June 2021, the album had sold 28,948 copies in the UK. Louder Than War included the album at 185 on their list of the best albums of the year.

== Track listing ==
All songs written by Tim Booth, Jim Glennie, Saul Davies and Mark Hunter, except "Coming Home (Pt.2)", written by Booth, Glennie, Davies, Hunter and Larry Gott. All lyrics by Booth. All recordings produced by Charlie Andrew and Beni Giles.

1. "Hank" – 3:33
2. "Coming Home (Pt.2)" – 3:41
3. "Leviathan" – 4:31
4. "Heads" – 4:40
5. "Many Faces" – 5:15
6. "How Hard the Day" – 3:25
7. "Extraordinary Times" – 4:43
8. "Picture of This Place" – 6:02
9. "Hope to Sleep" – 4:12
10. "Better Than That" – 4:17
11. "Mask" – 5:15
12. "What's It All About" – 7:33

Deluxe edition bonus tracks

13. "Backwards Glances" – 4:09
14. "Moving Car" (demo) – 5:37
15. "Overdose" (demo) – 4:23
16. "Trouble" (demo) – 4:29

== Personnel ==
Personnel per booklet.

James

- Tim Booth – lead vocals, percussion, backing vocals
- Jim Glennie – bass guitar, percussion
- Saul Davies – percussion, guitar, violin
- Mark Hunter – keyboards, percussion, drum programming
- Andy Diagram – trumpet, backing vocals
- Adrian Oxaal – guitar, backing vocals, cello
- David Baynton-Power – drums, percussion

Additional musicians

- Brian Eno – synth programming
- Charlie Andrew – synth programming, additional drum programming, percussion, congas, bells, drums, horn arrangement
- Beni Giles – synth programming, additional drum programming, percussion, bells, Moog bass, harmonium, lead guitar, drums, horn arrangement

Additional musicians (continued)

- Rick Webster – additional programming, backing vocals
- Peter Robertson – percussion, drums
- Katie Earl – percussion
- Tom Archer – percussion
- Adam Betts – percussion, drums
- Henri Davis – additional percussion
- Mark Brown – saxophone
- Pat Hartley – trombone
- Trevor Mires – trombone, bass trombone
- Larion Stolk – backing vocals
- Ron Yeadon – backing vocals
- Josephine Stephenson – choir
- Kate Huggett – choir
- Sarah Latto – choir

Production and design

- Charlie Andrew – producer, mixing
- Beni Giles – producer, mixing
- Jay Pocknell – assistant mix engineer
- Katie Earl – assistant mix engineer
- Dan Moyler – recording engineer
- Billy Halliday – recording engineer
- Tom Archer – assistant recording engineer
- Henri Davis – assistant recording engineer
- Dick Beetham – mastering
- Magnus Gjoen – artwork
- Studio Juice – design, layout

== Charts ==
Chart performance for Living in Extraordinary Times
Chart (2018)	Peak position
Belgian Albums (Ultratop Flanders)	172
Portuguese Albums (AFP)	38
UK Albums (OCC)	6
US Independent Albums (Billboard)	29
