= The Morning After (James album) =

Studio album by James
- Released: 6 September 2010
- Recorded: April 2010
- Studio: Fish Factory, London; L.A.B, Brighton
- Genre: Indie rock
- Length: 31:09
- Label: Mercury
- Producer: James, Lee Muddy Baker

James chronology
The Night Before (2010)	The Morning After (2010)	La Petite Mort (2014)

The Morning After is the 12th studio album by British rock band James, serving as the second of two mini-albums. As their first mini-album The Night Before was being released in April 2010, the band began working on its follow-up. Spending less than a week in the studio, the band self-produced the sessions, with Lee Muddy Baker handling vocal production. The Morning After featured slower and softer songs, in contrast to the happy, upbeat ones heard on The Night Before. Preceded by festival appearances in the UK, Greece and Portugal, The Morning After was released on 6 September. The album reached number 19 in the UK, and received a mainly favourable response from music critics, with some of them stating it was the better release out of the two mini-albums. The band promoted it with tours in North America, Portugal and the UK.

== Background and production ==
In November 2009, the group announced they would be releasing two mini-albums in 2010, the first (The Night Before) being planned for released in April. The Night Before was released as intended in April, and promoted with a UK tour in the same month. Following the final date of the tour, they spent five days in a recording studio and planned not to make any overdubs. It was spurred on by how they recorded The Night Before, which saw the group upload material to a FTP server that Lee Muddy Baker would edited together. They soon realised they were writing two separate kinds of tracks, specifically softer types of tracks.

Since only one-to-two of these kinds of songs made it on to their albums previously, the band decided to do a whole record of them. Sessions were held at Fish Factory in London with them self-producing the recordings. They were aided by engineers Desmond Lambert and Antonio Feold. Booth's vocals were recorded and produced by Baker at L.A.B in Brighton. Class 4J of Coleridge Primary School recorded backing vocals for "Tell Her I Said So". Jonathon Shakhovskay mixed the recordings in The Engine Room at Miloco Studios, with assistance from engineers Bryan Wilson and Rhys Downing. They were then mastered by Geoff Pesche at Abbey Road Studios.

== Composition ==
All of the songs on The Morning After were written by Tim Booth, Larry Gott and Jim Glennie, with lyrics written by Booth. Musically, The Morning After has been described as indie rock. In contrast to The Night Before, which featured up-tempo, happy tracks, The Morning After showcased softer and slower-tempo songs. Booth explained that they had previously written mellow songs that did not fit the sound of past releases: ""Because we like albums to take them on tour; we can’t have too many mellow songs, when you’re known as a live band". As a compromise, they put this kind of material on The Morning After.

Booth said it was easy and natural for the group to write songs of this ilk. He had previously joined a writing collective in Los Angeles, California; he theorised that being a part of that aided him in taking more risks with the material on The Morning After. It explored the themes of introspection, the vulnerability of life, and destruction. In a 2014 interview, Booth felt that the final form of The Morning After did not live up to their expectations: "The minute we started working on some of songs for The Morning After, they kind of ‘uplifted themselves’, just by the structure.[...] We’d had it like a hangover record, and it didn’t quite turn out like that".

The opening song "Got the Shakes" is a slow-tempo blues-esque track; it talks about an alcohol-fuelled assault with the man begging his wife for forgiveness. "Dust Motes" features slide guitar from Gott and sees Booth sing in a falsetto. It was a mix of Americana and Coldplay, and opened with a brief piano intro. It stars a man noticing dustmotes in fractions of light, while being stunned by the end of his relationship. "Tell Her I Said So" is led by indie rock-sounding drums and tremolo-affected synthesizers, which channel the work of Brian Eno. Booth's vocal eventually gives way to a children's choir in the vein of the one heard in "Another Brick in the Wall" by Pink Floyd. Booth wrote the song while his mother was on the verge of death in a care home; she was in an hallucinogenic frame-of-mind due to prescribed drugs.

"Kaleidoscope" sees a husband worried that his wife is talking to another lover over the phone, when in reality she's receiving negative news from a doctor that she has cancer. Booth had the idea for it after being found on the phone, attempting to organise a party for his wife. "Rabbit Hole" talks about self-questioning doubt with references to Alice in Wonderland (1865). "Make for This City" features cellos and details living in a metropolitan reality. "Lookaway" is an electronica song with strings and steel-string guitar work. It discusses growing old, and alienation. "Fear" is the inner monologue feeling that a person has lived too long.

== Release and reception ==
Professional ratings
Aggregate scores
Source	Rating
Metacritic	76/100
Review scores
Source	Rating
AllMusic	3.5/5 stars
The Independent	4/5 stars
Mojo	4/5 stars
musicOMH	3/5 stars
Record Collector	4/5 stars
Uncut	3/5 stars

=== Promotion and touring ===
Between June and September, the band at festivals in Portugal, Greece and the UK. On 11 July, The Morning After was announced for release in September, with its cover artwork and track listing being revealed. Five of the album's tracks were previewed on the group's website in the week before its release; The Morning After appeared on 6 September. The iTunes version included an alternative version of "Lookaway" as a bonus track. It reached number 19 on the UK album chart.

The band went on a North American tour in September and October 2010, with support from Ed Harcourt. Coinciding with this, The Morning After The Night Before was released on 14 September 2010, which included both mini-albums. Preceded by two shows in Portugal, the group embarked on a UK tour in December, where they were supported by Frazer King. At the end of March and start of April 2011, the group played two shows in South America. This was followed by a series of festival appearances between May and October in Portugal, the UK, Greece, Spain and Turkey. In October 2011, the album was reissued as a two-CD package with Hey Ma (2008). An Absolute Radio session version of "Dust Motes" was included on the career-spanning box set The Gathering Sound (2012).

=== Critical response ===
The Morning After received generally positive reviews from music critics, according to review aggregator Metacritic. The Independent's music critic Andy Gill viewed as a "far superior effort" to The Night Before, complimenting the "subtle songs about devastation" for packing "a powerful punch." Record Collector writer Jonathan Scott said the release provided "more focused offerings" that encapsulated the "essence of the band’s best work." Renowned for Sound founder Brendon Veevers referred to it as "an intense record", full of "chilling tales of reality mixed amongst fictional masterpieces."

BBC Music's David Sheppard wrote that while the songs weren't "earth-shattering", they were "consistently, discreetly affecting." AllMusic reviewer Stephen Thomas Erlewine said the album "succeeds in its own quiet way," when compared to The Night Before, while "maintaining a cool intimate vibe without seeming monochromatic." Neil Dowden of musicOMH said the release's "stripped down sound" could come across as a "bit depressing but their muted beauty lingers in the mind." Though it lacked "the same direct appeal" as seen on The Night Before, the tracks "are often touching and grow more so with each listen." QRO editor Ted Chase found The Morning After to be the "weaker half" of the two mini-albums with its stripped-down sound.

== Track listing ==
All songs written by Tim Booth, Larry Gott and Jim Glennie, all words by Booth.

1. "Got the Shakes" – 2:57
2. "Dust Motes" – 4:13
3. "Tell Her I Said So" – 4:37
4. "Kaleidoscope" – 3:06
5. "Rabbit Hole" – 3:41
6. "Make for This City" – 4:28
7. "Lookaway" – 4:18
8. "Fear" – 3:49

iTunes bonus track

9. "Lookaway" (alternative version)

== Personnel ==
Personnel per booklet.

James

- Tim Booth – lead vocals
- Jim Glennie – bass guitar
- Larry Gott – guitar
- Saul Davies – guitar, violin
- Mark Hunter – keyboards
- David Baynton-Power – drums
- Andy Diagram – trumpet

Additional musicians

- 4J – backing vocals (track 3)

Production

- James – producer
- Lee Muddy Baker – vocal producer, vocal recording
- Desmond Lambert – engineer
- Antonio Feola – engineer
- Jonathon Shakhovskay – mixing
- Bryan Wilson – assistant mix engineer
- Rhys Downing – assistant mix engineer
- Geoff Pesche – mastering
- Adam Rix – design, art direction
- The Neighbourhood – illustration

== Charts ==
Chart (2010)	Peak position
UK Albums (OCC)	19
