= Girl at the End of the World =

Album by James

Studio album by James
- Released: 18 March 2016
- Recorded: May–September 2015
- Studio: RAK; Offtape, London
- Genre: Electronic
- Length: 44:45
- Label: BMG
- Producer: Max Dingel

James chronology
La Petite Mort (2014)	Girl at the End of the World (2016)	Living in Extraordinary Times (2018)

Singles from Girl at the End of the World
- 1. "Nothing But Love" Released: 1 March 2016; 2. "Attention" Released: 11 March 2016; 3. "To My Surprise" Released: 1 April 2017

Girl at the End of the World is the 14th studio album by British rock band James. It was released on 11 March 2016, through BMG. The band spent three weeks in the Scottish Highlands working on new material for their album. Re-enlisting producer Max Dingel, who produced their previous studio album, La Petite Mort (2014), James spent five months between May and September 2015 recording in separate blocks. Long-time collaborator Brian Eno, and former member Adrian Oxaal, contributed instrumentation to the sessions. The album reprised its predecessor's electronic-centred songs and dance rhythm sections.

Girl at the End of the World received generally positive reviews from music critics, with some complimenting James' change in style. It peaked at number one in Scotland and number two in the UK, as well as charting in Belgium and Portugal. "Nothing But Love" was released as the lead single in March 2016, being followed by the second single "Attention" two months later. James promoted the album with a UK tour in May 2016, and appeared at a number of festivals over the succeeding few months. "To My Surprise" was released as the third single in April 2017, which was followed by UK festival appearances in July and August.

== Background and development ==
James released their 13th studio album La Petite Mort in June 2014. La Petite Mort was a shift for the band, encouraged by producer Max Dingel, using less organic-sounding drums. Although some band members were hesitant, the album was a success. By October 2014, the band had started writing material for its follow-up. When touring to promote La Petite Mort concluded at the end of the year, vocalist Tim Booth asked Dingel if he would produce their next album; recording had been planned for mid-2015. Their label, BMG, suggested that the band should return to the studio to work on their next album while they had momentum built up. James travelled to the Scottish Highlands in January 2015, and spent three weeks working on material, as they had done for La Petite Mort; writing sessions this time included keyboardist Mark Hunter and guitarist-violinist Saul Davies. Despite an attempt to avoid distractions, the band took breaks to explore nearby beaches. Writing was divided between the Tolbooth in Stirling and a house in Gairloch.

James set up a space on the top floor of the Tolbooth, building a rehearsal room with mattresses that were taped to the windows for soundproofing. The band then moved to Gairloch, where they wrote additional material. James jammed on improvised material, playing against a drum machine set to high tempos to help create songs they felt would be good in a live setting. Booth generated beats and altered the rhythm with the FunkBox app on his iPhone. The jams lasted from 10 minutes to over an hour. All of them were recorded by Hunter; if a band member liked one, the jam would be edited down to a three-to-eight-minute recording. The band later worked on the segments, developing them into songs. Booth often sang phonetics, with an occasional line or word spoken, attempting to come up with melodies. James sent Dingel over 20 potential song ideas, most of which he liked.

== Recording and production ==
During a series of festival performances, Girl at the End of the World was recorded at RAK Studios and Offtape Studios, which are both in London, with Dingel producing. The recording sessions were split into three blocks throughout 2015; the first in late May and early June, the second in July, and the third in late August and early September. Though James worked on most of the songs they had sent Dignal during the May–June block, little of them were in a finished state. Although Dingel anticipated picking up where they had left off when recording La Petite Mort, the band took a while to get back into the groove of recording. For the July block, James recorded more tracks live in the studio; some ended up on the final recordings, although numerous songs were built around programmed and electronic sections. The band had tried recording "Nothing But Love" during the first block, but scrapped it and re-recorded the song in the second block.

The final block, in August and September, saw James work on the last details of the recordings, and complete some lead vocals for the tracks. Hannes Plattmeier and Manon Grandjean served as the main engineers, accompanied by additional engineers Izzy Grundy, Joel Davies and Ran Steiner. Booth contacted Brian Eno, who had produced five of James' previous albums, about helping with two tracks on which they were working, one of them being "Nothing But Love". Glennie said Eno's contributions amounted to "sporadic problem solving". This marked their first collaboration since the band's ninth studio album Pleased to Meet You (2001). Dingel mixed the recordings over a three-to-four week period in late September and early October 2015 at Mothership, with the exception of "Waking" being done by Plattmeier, before they were mastered by Dick Beetham at 360 Mastering.

== Composition and lyrics ==
All the songs on Girl at the End of the World were written by Booth, guitarist Larry Gott, bassist Jim Glennie, Davies and Hunter, with lyrics by Booth. The album continues the sound of La Petite Mort, with electronic-focused tracks and dance rhythm sections. Davies said that working at Tolbooth gave it "a weird Scottish flavour ... a Celtic kind of theme." Unlike La Petite Mort, which is centred around one theme, the songs on Girl at the End of the World address a variety of motifs: love, passion, imagery of fire and traveling, and living in California. Dingel added synthesized bass to "Bitch", and electronic drums throughout the album. Eno played the synthesizer on "Nothing But Love", and former guitarist Adrian Oxaal played cello and mandolin on the song as well as "Girl at the End of the World". Larion Stolk arranged the backing vocals, which were sung by touring member Ron Yeadon. In addition to his regular role as James' keyboardist, Hunter played guitar on "Waking".

"Bitch" opens with a bass riff that begins a two-minute electropop intro, which was edited together from several recordings. It then shifts into krautrock and space rock similar to the music of Hawkwind. The wonky pop and synth-pop song "To My Surprise" continues the previous track's upbeat sound, with a more dance-like nature. The song was compared to music by the Killers, a band whom Dingel had previously produced for. "Nothing But Love" is an anthemic track with a chorus that repeats the title phrase. According to Booth, the song is about "love's euphoria and ecstasy – that love-bomb that goes off and changes everything." "Attention" begins as a piano ballad, turning into a dance track with a techno feeling. It initially began as two separate tracks that were merged during the recording sessions. Booth said that the change was decided upon when some band members sped "it up to a mega-fast, comedy Pinky & Perky speed." Booth wrote the song's lyrics after he and his family moved further north to Berkeley, California, before moving back to Topanga eight months later when his son could not settle down in Berkeley. "Dear John" is a synth-pop track about the end of a relationship; the synthesizer line is reminiscent of the one in Kylie Minogue's "Can't Get You Out of My Head" (2001). Booth referred to it as a "[j]aunty dark divorce song"; it was originally called "Jesus" and tackled sexual abuse by priests.

Booth examines mortality and art on the acoustic "Feet of Clay", recalling the title track from James' fourth studio album Seven (1992). The electro track "Surfer's Song" was written after Booth saw his son surfing. "Catapult" has a drum and bass beat, and a guitar riff reminiscent of the music of Ned's Atomic Dustbin. Booth wrote the song about "someone close where the red mist would descend after a few glasses of red." "Move Down South" features an alternative country-sounding slide guitar, with distorted riffs being played in the vein of The Joshua Tree (1987)-era U2. The opening evokes some of James' earliest songs, such as "Hymn from a Village" (1985), and deals with droughts in California, where Booth lived. The Goldfrapp-esque track "Alvin" was named for Alvin Stardust. Booth sang it in French, much to the confusion of his bandmates. "Waking" showcases Diagram's trumpet playing with a Casio-synthesized beat. Discussing "Girl at the End of the World", Booth said that there were several hairpin turns near his home in Topanga where drivers would go over the edge. The song's lyrics address "what would I feel if I came round the corner and that was it ... I got this split second to just appreciate my life."

== Release and promotion ==
In August 2015, James made a number of festival appearances; Gott was unable to play the shows, being replaced by Oxaal. Glennie later revealed that Gott left as he "didn't want to do what we were doing". On 16 November 2015, Girl at the End of the World was announced for release in March 2016. That same month, "To My Surprise" was made available for streaming, after a premiere via BBC Radio 6. Alongside this, the album's track listing was revealed. The song's music video, made by Kris Merc, premiered on The Quietus' website on 16 December 2015. According to Booth, the video stars a "female activist/terrorist detonates a love bomb which dismantles our fear based society." On 22 January 2016, "Move Down South" premiered on BBC Radio 6; this was followed by the premiere of "Nothing But Love" on BBC Radio 2 two weeks later. Two release shows for Girl at the End of the World were played in February 2016, followed by a performance at the Dubai Jazz Festival.

"Nothing But Love" was released as the album's lead single on 1 March 2016. Its music video, directed by James FitzGerald, premiered on Clash's website that same day. "Attention" was released as the second single on 11 March 2016. Girl at the End of the World was made available for streaming via The Telegraph's website, before its 18 March 2016 release through BMG, the first of a three-album contract with the label. Glennie said BMG acted closer to a publishing company as opposed to a traditional record label, where they "never really work with you as a company unless they are handling your publishing". BMG let the band assemble their own team within the company, particularly those that were enthusiastic about James, to help promote the album. Initially promotional efforts saw the band give a series of in-store performances and signings. They began a UK tour in May 2016, with support from the Slow Readers Club and Jack Savoretti.

On 23 May 2016, the music video for "Girl at the End of the World", also made by Merc, premiered on Culture Collide's website; it features the Killers frontman Brandon Flowers and Alexandra Chelaru. James played at a number of festivals across France, the UK, Spain, Greece, and Portugal between June and September 2016, including an opening slot at Glastonbury. The music video for "Dear John", directed by Péter Vácz, premiered via Under the Radar's website on 6 July 2016. In November 2016, the band toured Australia for the first time, and played shows in New Zealand. The following month, James played a one-off show at the Echo Arena in Liverpool with the Charlatans. The band played in Mexico during March and April 2017, with "To My Surprise" being released as the third single from Girl at the End of the World during the latter month. James played at festivals across the UK in July and August 2017, including Sounds of the City in Manchester.

== Reception ==
Professional ratings
Aggregate scores
Source	Rating
AnyDecentMusic?	6.6/10
Metacritic	75/100
Review scores
Source	Rating
AllMusic	3.5/5 stars
Clash	6/10
Drowned in Sound	6/10
Louder Than War	9/10
The Music	4/5 stars
musicOMH	3.5/5 stars
Record Collector	3/5 stars
The Skinny	3/5 stars
Uncut	7/10
Under the Radar	6/10 stars

Girl at the End of the World was met with generally favourable reviews from music critics. At Metacritic, which assigns a normalized rating out of 100 to reviews from mainstream publications, the album received an average score of 69, based on 10 reviews. AnyDecentMusic? gave it a score of 6.6, based on 8 reviews.

The Music writer Mac McNaughton called Girl at the End of the World "densely produced," which "almost suffocat[ed] the guitars in places." McNaughton wrote that it was band's most emotional record since Pleased to Meet You. Under the Radar's Aug Stone appreciated the tracks in the middle of the album that pushed James' sound, but felt let down by the title track because it "reverts to the more safe James sound." Clash writer Sam Walker-Smart wrote that although the album has "some bad ideas," he liked the band's decision to experiment, and "sounding like they're enjoying it while they do." Dan Lucas of Drowned in Sound said that despite the album attempting to shy away from the rock sound of James' previous records, it was "an uncertain" move.

AllMusic reviewer Timothy Monger wrote that Girl at the End of the World is "a little stylistically scattershot and lacking in cohesion." Louder Than War writer Martin Unsworth said that the album is "certainly a strong one," though it isn't "re-inventing the wheel, but it certainly isn't repackaging it either." In a review for musicOMH, Neil Dowden found the album "much more positive" despite lacking emotional depth. According to Record Collector's Max Bell, the album is "never short on dizzying rhythmic crescendos." Gary Kaill of The Skinny saw it as "more of the same" from James, with "bulging" arrangements, and "hefty half-hooks" that are "intelligent, accomplished and likeable."

Girl at the End of the World came close to knocking Adele's album 25 (2015) off the top of the UK Albums Chart; it reached number one on the midweek chart in its first week of release, 2,000 units ahead of Adele's album. At the end of its first full week of release, the album debuted at number two on the chart. In Scotland, however, it reached the top spot on the Scottish Album Chart. The album reached number 35 in Portugal, number 149 in the Wallonia region of Belgium, and number 194 in the Flanders region of the country. QRO ranked the album at number 11 on their list of the top 15 best releases from the year. Clash included "Nothing But Love" on their list of the top 10 best James songs.

== Track listing ==
All songs written by Tim Booth, Larry Gott, Jim Glennie, Saul Davies, and Mark Hunter. All lyrics by Booth. All recordings produced by Max Dingel.

1. "Bitch" – 4:52
2. "To My Surprise" – 4:21
3. "Nothing But Love" – 3:29
4. "Attention" – 4:08
5. "Dear John" – 4:04
6. "Feet of Clay" – 2:37
7. "Surfer's Song" – 3:51
8. "Catapult" – 4:02
9. "Move Down South" – 5:19
10. "Alvin" – 2:13
11. "Waking" – 2:44
12. "Girl at the End of the World" – 3:00

== Personnel ==
Personnel per booklet.

James

- Tim Booth – lead vocals
- Larry Gott – guitar
- Jim Glennie – bass guitar
- Saul Davies – guitar, violin
- Mark Hunter – keyboards, guitar (track 11), drum programming
- David Baynton-Power – drums
- Andy Diagram – trumpet

Additional musicians

- Brian Eno – synthesizer (track 3)
- Adrian Oxaal – cello (tracks 3 and 12), mandolin (tracks 3 and 12)
- Max Dingel – synth bass (track 1), electronic drums
- Ron Yeadon – backing vocals
- Larion Stolk – backing vocal arranger

Production and design

- Max Dingel – producer, mixing (all tracks except track 11)
- Hannes Plattmeier – engineer, mixing (track 11)
- Manon Grandjean – engineer
- Izzy Grundy – additional engineer
- Joel Davies – additional engineer
- Ran Steiner – additional engineer
- Dick Beetham – mastering
- Luke Insect – artwork

== Charts ==
Chart performance for Girl at the End of the World
Chart (2016)	Peak position
Belgian Albums (Ultratop Flanders)	194
Belgian Albums (Ultratop Wallonia)	149
Portuguese Albums (AFP)	35
Scottish Albums (OCC)	1
UK Albums (OCC)	2
