= The Night Before (James album) =

Studio album by James
- Released: 19 April 2010
- Genre: Power pop, space rock
- Length: 29:12
- Label: Mercury
- Producer: Lee Muddy Baker, James

James chronology
Hey Ma (2008)	The Night Before (2010)	The Morning After (2010)

The Night Before is the 11th studio album by British rock band James, serving as the first of two mini-albums. Following the release of their 10th studio album Hey Ma (2008), the band sought to experiment and take risks for their next record. They worked on material and uploaded it to a FTP server, for download by others. After three months, Lee Muddy Baker pieced the tracks together. The Night Before is a power pop and space rock release, with individual track comparisons to U2, Joy Division and Cocteau Twins. Preceded by a UK tour, The Night Before was released on 19 April 2010. The album reached number 20 in the UK, and received a mainly favourable response from music critics, with a few of them finding it an enjoyable record.

== Background and production ==
After a six-year-long break up, James reunited in 2007 and released their 10th studio album Hey Ma in 2008. Critics viewed it as a return-to-form for the band; they wanted to experiment and take risks for its follow-up. At the end of the year, Booth said the band had 50–60 songs ready for their next album. The members would record 30-minute long improvisations, and each would be uploaded to a FTP server. The members could download and work on it at home. They would either continue one of the members' ideas or work on new parts around it. Booth said this methodology was likely inspired by working with Brian Eno, which they had done for nine-to-ten years.

The process lasted for three months; after that, Lee Muddy Baker edited it all together. Despite the members living in separate locations, Booth said it wasn't due to the convenience of it, but as a manner to keep their creative activity fresh: "We were brainstorming. We're always looking for things to throw us off track." Producer credit was split between Baker and the band. Jonathon Shakhovskay mixed the recordings in The Engine Room at Miloco Studios in January 2010, with assistance from engineer Bryan Wilson. Geoff Pesche then mastered them at Abbey Road Studios.

== Composition ==
Musically, The Night Before has been described as power pop and space rock, with up-tempo, happy tracks. Some parts of the release saw the band re-tread the same ground as before, with loud aggressive guitars and distorted vocals parts from Booth. Other sections featured Booth unaltered vocals over electronic backgrounds or echo-affected guitar work. "It's Hot" is a keyboard-led track with synthesized-beats and electronic sounds, and was compared to Joy Division. Discussing "Crazy", Booth said he was suffering with liver disease in his teenage years and would hallucinate because of it; the song was reminiscent of the work of U2. "Ten Below" sees Booth reflect on listening to John Peel's radio show while enduring education in a Welsh boarding school.

"Porcupine" discusses self-defence; Booth seeing himself as the animal of the same name, against a skunk. The slide guitar recalled the dream pop sound of Cocteau Twins and U2 guitarist The Edge. "Shine" is a mid-tempo track that criticizes rich people, and was also compared to U2. "Dr Hellier" talks about the Iraq War and the film Fantastic Voyage (1966). It incorporated basslines in the vein of New Order. Booth wrote it after having shoulder operation with a James Bond-esque doctor. "All My Letters" was written after Booth was featured on Friday Night with Jonathan Ross alongside Will Smith and Jay-Z; it talks about the cost of fame. The closing song, "Hero", evokes the gospel blues and electronic sound of Cold War Kids.

== Release and reception ==
Professional ratings
Review scores
Source	Rating
AllMusic	3.5/5 stars
Daily Record	3/5
DIY	3.5/5 stars
The Guardian	4/5 stars
musicOMH	3.5/5 stars
PopMatters	7/10 stars
The Times	2/5 stars

=== Promotion and touring ===
On 30 November 2009, the band announced they would be releasing two mini-albums in 2010, with the first The Night Before planned for released in April 2010. On 16 March 2010, the track listing for the album was revealed. In April 2010, the band embarked on The Mirrorball Tour in the United Kingdom, with support from James Walsh and Unkle Bob. The Night Before was made available for streaming through The Independent's website, before being released on 19 April 2010. The iTunes version included "All My Letters" as a bonus track. Deciding to release a mini album, Booth reasoned that attention spans were getting shorter, and that with the dominance of iTunes, people weren't listening to full albums any more. To promote the album's release, the band performed a series of radio sessions. The Night Before reached number 20 on the UK album chart. "All My Letters" was later included on the career-spanning box set The Gathering Sound (2012).

=== Critical response ===
The Night Before received generally positive reviews from music critics. The Guardian critic Dave Simpsons said it was "one of the strongest efforts of their career". PopMatters writer John Garratt said it showcased the band's ability for "big songs, even if they are for a small album". DIY contributor Lee White viewed it as "a tight and taught little collection" with "absolutely zero filler". AllMusic reviewer Stephen Thomas Erlewine wrote that the "propulsive and seductive" nature of the release "grabs upon its initial listen". The Line of Best Fit's Andy Johnson was impressed with the manner that the band "are able to carry off the weighty themes", while being able to "still turn the whole cocktail into such a readily listenable and digestible package".

In a brief review, Daily Record said it "include[d] potential new favourites such as Porcupine and Ten Below". Neil Dowden of musicOMH said it would be "welcomed by James fans", though it would be unlikely to "make new converts". BBC Music's Tom Hocknell criticised its short length, finding the "constituent pieces failing to fully gel". While noting they were an impressive live act, the live energy "is often lacking here". The Times writer Dan Cairns remarked the band as coming across as a "Runrig/Deacon Blue with a new-age gloss," becoming "their own tribute band, James live to blight another day".

== Track listing ==
All words by Tim Booth, all tracks written by Booth, Larry Gott, Jim Glennie.

1. "It's Hot" – 3:26
2. "Crazy" – 3:39
3. "Ten Below" – 4:03
4. "Porcupine" – 4:27
5. "Shine" – 4:18
6. "Dr Hellier" – 4:46
7. "Hero" – 4:33

iTunes bonus track

8. "All My Letters" – 3:07

== Personnel ==
Personnel per booklet.

James

- Tim Booth – lead vocals
- Jim Glennie – bass guitar
- Larry Gott – guitar
- Saul Davies – guitar, violin
- Mark Hunter – keyboards
- David Baynton-Power – drums
- Andy Diagram – trumpet

Production

- Lee Muddy Baker – producer
- James – producer
- Jonathon Shakhovskay – mixing
- Bryan Wilson – assistant mix engineer
- Geoff Pesche – mastering
- Adam Rix – design, art direction
- The Neighbourhood – illustration

== Charts ==
Chart performance for The Night Before
Chart (2010)	Peak position
UK Albums (OCC)	20
