= Saul Davies =

British musician

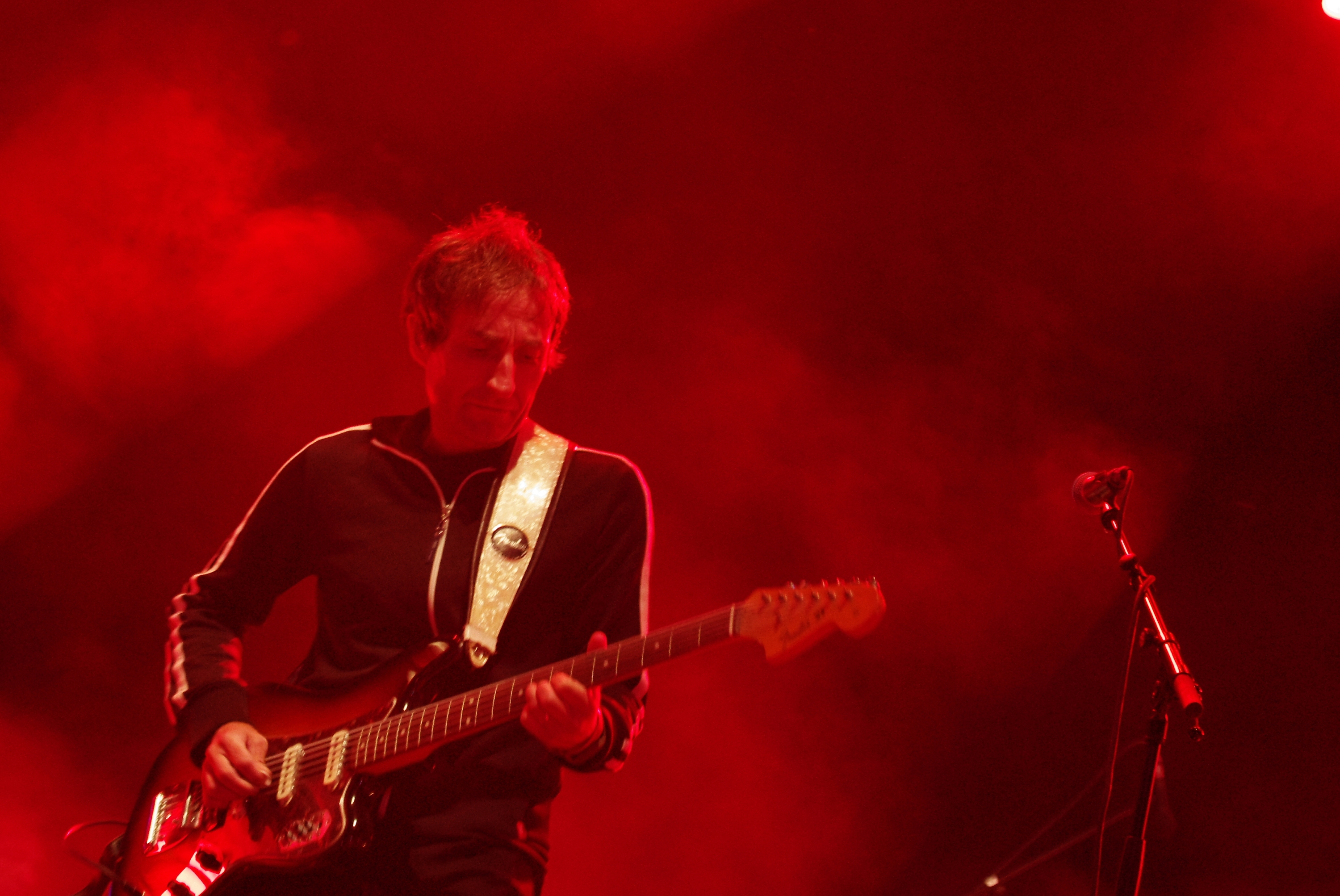
- Saul Davies performing with James at Haldern Pop 2013

Background information
- Born: Saul Davies; 28 June 1965 (age 61); Liverpool, England
- Occupation: Musician
- Instruments: Guitar; violin; percussion; drums; vocals
- Years active: 1989–present
- Member of: James (1989–2001, 2007–present)

Saul Davies (born 28 June 1965) is a British musician best known as a member of the rock band James. Davies is a multi-instrumentalist whose primary instruments are the violin, guitar and percussion.

== Career ==
Saul Davies was hired as a member of James in 1989, after the band's guitarist Larry Gott saw him playing violin at the Band On The Wall in Manchester. Impressed by his abilities, Gott invited Davies to join the band at their rehearsal room the following day for an audition.

Davies immediately impressed the band members, who offered him a role in the band as violinist. Davies accepted, initially as a stop-gap measure, and went on to assist with guitar and percussion on the band's 1990 album Gold Mother, which was also to become the band's commercial breakthrough.

Davies ended up remaining with the band throughout the 1990s, and his creative input became more prominent towards the end of the decade, particularly on the 1999 album Millionaires, most of the songs of which were developed from base tracks sketched out by Davies. His contribution was recognized in the sleeve notes for the album with bassist Jim Glennie's comment- "Jim Glennie would like to personally thank Saul for his work on this album over and above the call of duty."

Davies also participated in the dance-based side-project Money, together with fellow band members David Baynton-Power and Mark Hunter.

Following the departure in 2001 of the band's lead singer Tim Booth, the band became inactive and Davies confirmed his own departure in two separate articles throughout 2002.

With the band's reformation in 2007, Davies was confirmed as part of the reformed line-up and joined the band on their reunion tour in April of that year, then played on their comeback album Hey Ma released in April 2008, then released by two mini-albums, The Night Before and The Morning After in 2010, then by 2014's thirteenth album La Petite Mort and recently, the 2016's current album Girl at the End of the World.

Davies is known among James fans for his raucous stage persona and his skill at provoking audience members into exuberant singalongs.
