= Hey Ma (album) =

Studio album by James
- Released: 7 April 2008
- Recorded: September–December 2007
- Studios: Château de Warsy, France; Hotspur Press, Manchester; The Premises, Hoxton; Scream, Brighton
- Genre: Indie rock
- Length: 46:12
- Label: Fontana
- Producers: Lee Muddy Baker, James

James chronology
Pleased to Meet You (2001)	Hey Ma (2008)	The Night Before (2010)

Singles from Hey Ma
- 1. "Whiteboy" Released: 24 June 2008; 2. "Waterfall" Released: 5 August 2008

Hey Ma is the tenth studio album by British rock band James. After reuniting in 2007, James went on tour until September that year, when they began recording their next album. Taking up residence in Château de Warsy in France, the band worked on 120 pieces of music. While extra recording was done in England, sessions concluded by December. Hey Ma was a return-to-form for the band as they continued their signature sound of loud guitars and big choruses, with occasional trumpet appearances. Before the album was released, the cover was banned due to its depiction of a baby with a gun close by.

Hey Ma was released on 7 April 2008 through Fontana Records. It was promoted with radio sessions, a UK tour and an appearance on Later... with Jools Holland. "Whiteboy" and "Waterfall" were released as singles on 24 June and 5 August, respectively. Coinciding with the North American release, they embarked on a tour in that territory in September and October; another UK tour followed by the year's end. Receiving positive reviews from critics, who enjoyed its return-to-form sound, the album peaked at number 10 in the UK Albums Chart.

== Background ==
James released their ninth album Pleased to Meet You in 2001. By the end of the year, vocalist Tim Booth left the band, who would break-up thereafter amidst drug abuse and tension between members. Guitarist Michael Kulas returned to his solo career, which he put on hold upon joining James in the mid-1990s. Booth spent his time meditating, performing dance and becoming an actor. Trumpeter Andy Diagram recorded and toured with his band Spaceheads, before they eventually went dormant in 2003. Bassist Jim Glennie continued working in the music industry, helping songwriters and doing production work. In addition to this, Glennie continued to jam with former guitarist Larry Gott, who had left the band in 1995, but had joined them for their farewell concert. During these jam sessions, they would write new material and recorded some of it. In 2004, the pair made a demo tape and contacted Booth, who had no interest in joining them, having finished a solo album, had a child and moved residence.

Booth's debut studio album, Bone, was a critical success; Booth returned to acting and appeared in theatre. However, by late 2006, Booth was visiting Manchester for a weekend and joined Glennie and Gott for a jam session. Glennie said it was a test to see if the trio could make new songs that they would be proud of. A year prior to the meet-up, Booth had seen Bruce Springsteen play with his reformed E Street Band. Booth was impressed with the manner Springsteen reinvented the material; he reasoned that had he not seen Springsteen, he would have said no to a potential James reunion. When visiting for the jam, Booth had told their manager, who soon got in contact with booking agency SJM Concerts. Within a day, a comeback tour was planned for the following year.

After three days of jamming, the trio had come up with the basic structures of 30 songs. After this, multi-instrumentalist Saul Davies, keyboardist Mark Hunter, drummer David Baynton-Power and Diagram re-joined the trio. In January 2007, the band announced they had reunited, and embarked on a brief reunion tour in the United Kingdom in April 2007. Coinciding with this, the band's former label Mercury Records released the Fresh as a Daisy – The Singles compilation. This release and the tour would help finance the band's next album; by this time, they had 90 potential ideas to choose from. Between June and August 2007, the band appeared at various festivals in the UK, Spain, Greece, Turkey and Portugal.

== Production ==
In September 2007, James travelled to France with Lee Muddy Baker, who had previously worked with Booth, co-producing Bone. By this point, they had accumulated 120 pieces of music for the album. The members built their own studios at the Château de Warsy in France. The set-up consisted of a main studio as well as personal studios for each member in their rooms. It allowed each member to constantly feed ideas back to Baker in the main studio, and jam at their leisure. Producer credit was split between Baker and the band. Ben Caro served as the engineer, while KK aided with vocal engineering. Sessions continued into December 2007; after returning to the UK, "Whiteboy" was recorded at Hotspur Press in Manchester, "72" at The Premises in Hoxton, and "I Wanna Go Home" at Scream in Brighton.

In addition to their regular instruments, Gott, Davies and Diagram provided extra roles during recording: Gott doing additional backing vocals on "Waterfall" and "Upside"; Davies playing additional drums on "Waterfall" and "Semaphore"; and Diagram singing additional backing vocals on "Of Monsters & Heroes & Men". Baker also performed extra roles in addition to his production: additional backing vocals on "Waterfall", "Upside", "72" and "I Wanna Go Home"; additional drums on "Oh My Heart"; percussion on "72" and "I Wanna Go Home"; acoustic guitar on "Of Monsters & Heroes & Men"; and electric guitar on "I Wanna Go Home". Rob Kenny of the Lovegods contributed drums on "I Wanna Go Home". Danton Supple mixed "Bubbles", "Hey Ma", "Waterfall", "Upside", "Whiteboy" and "I Wanna Go Home", while Jonathon Shakhovskay and Baker mixed the remaining tracks. Chris Potter then mastered the recordings at Alchemy Studios.

== Composition ==
Hey Ma continued James' signature indie rock sound of loud guitar work, big chorus sections, and occasional appearances of brass instruments, though they reduced the amount of keyboard parts. It drew comparison to their fifth studio album Laid (1993), and U2. Adrian Cepeda of Treble noted similarities to You Cross My Path by the Charlatans, Ringleader of the Tormentors by Morrissey and Weightlifting (2004) by the Trash Can Sinatras. When choosing songs for the album, Booth said they purposely picked the more upbeat tracks that would work well in a live setting. "Bubbles" detailed the birth of Booth's second son; Cepeda wrote that by its end, the group "explodes in horns, guitars and drums announcing the glorious return of these Manchester greats". Booth said "Hey Ma" was the UK and United States governments' "foolish response" to the September 11 attacks, and the invasion of Iraq. "Waterfall" discuses being middle-aged, and an instance where Booth went skinny-dipping at Snoqualmie Falls while he was working with Angelo Badalamenti. It was done in the vein of Lou Reed, and Blonde on Blonde (1966)-era Bob Dylan. "Oh My Heart" warns people to live every moment as if it was their last.

"Boom Boom" is an attack on the news media; it features an orchestrated coda section, influenced by Brian Eno, while the guitar work was reminiscent of Doves. "Semaphore" is an acoustic track that makes reference to growing older, and when communication between people breaks down. The violin-driven "Upside" is about immigrant labourers attempting to provide for their families. The piano heard on "Whiteboy" recalled the tracks on the band's eighth studio album Millionaires (1999). It told the story of a teenager sitting stoned at a table while his mother talks out loud about her problems. "72" is a take on religion, with an aim at Muslim fanatics and suicide bombers. "Of Monsters & Heroes & Men" is based on a poem. "I Wanna Go Home" talks about a man being unable to drown his sorrows at a bar. "Child to Burn" is a dark track that discusses child abuse.

== Release ==
On 11 December 2007, the band announced that their next album would be released in April 2008. In mid-March, the artwork was banned by JCDecaux as it went against their policy for not allowing guns in advertisements. Following this, the UK Advertising Standards Authority banned it from appearing on billboards to promote the album. Gott said the artwork was inspired by the news of an American infant who was accidentally given a license for firearms. Glennie said it reflected a number of anti-war tracks on the album, and was a critical statement of the "gun culture in Britain and America". The following day, the album's title Hey Ma was revealed, alongside the track listing. Leading up to the album's release, every track from it was made available for streaming through their website, one per day from late March 2008. Hey Ma was released on 7 April 2008, through Fontana Records. The iTunes version included "Child to Burn" as a bonus track, alongside track-by-track audio commentary.

To promote its release, the band performed some radio sessions. Following this, the band embarked on a UK tour, and performed on Later... with Jools Holland. In June, they played a one-off gig in Los Angeles, and appeared on the main stage at the 2008 Isle of Wight Festival. On 24 June 2008, "Whiteboy" was released as a single, which was followed by a performance of the album's title-track on Friday Night with Jonathan Ross. On 5 August 2008, "Waterfall" was released as a single. Hey Ma was released in North America on 16 September 2008 through Decca Records. Coinciding with this, the band went on a tour in that territory throughout September and October 2008, with support from Unkle Bob. Select record stores in the US were giving away a free promotional 7" vinyl of "Waterfall", backed with a live version of "Laid" as the B-side. In December 2008, the band went on another tour of the UK, with support from Athlete. The live album Live in 2008, recorded on the April 2008 UK tour, was available for sale during the December 2008 stint. In 2011, the album was reissued as a two-CD package with The Morning After (2010).

== Reception ==
Professional ratings
Aggregate scores
Source	Rating
Metacritic	73/100
Review scores
Source	Rating
AllMusic	4/5 stars
ChartAttack	4/5
The Guardian	3/5 stars
MusicOMH	4/5 stars
Pitchfork	7.4/10
PopMatters	8/10
Spin	6/10

Hey Ma was met with generally favourable from music critics. At Metacritic, which assigns a normalized rating out of 100 to reviews from mainstream publications, the album received an average score of 73, based on 10 reviews. PopMatters writer Michael Keefe said the band's break "seems to have served them well", as it "bursts with hunger and enthusiasm", which Cepeda also noted. ChartAttack's Aaron Brophy found it "a surprisingly solid and entirely welcome comeback album from these Manchester vets". AllMusic reviewer Stephen Thomas Erlewine said it was "such an extension of the band's signature sound that it's possible to think no time has passed at all". The band come across as sounding "revitalized" and "energized" by their split, while still "sounding connected to the time at hand". Michael Edwards of Exclaim! considered it "exactly the album fans expected" with tracks that "still strive to be a lot more serious than they have any right to be".

Entertainment Weekly writer Mikael Wood found that none of the tracks on the record "reproduces the dizzy rush" of the band's biggest song "Laid", however, "several cuts get surprisingly close". In a review for The Independent, Dominic Horner said as far as reunion records "go Hey Ma is more than adequate, and for fans of the band there is much to like". Hot Press' Olaf Tyaransen called it a "[w]elcome return to form" for the band, though "not much has changed" with the album, "but if it ain't broke, don't fix it". musicOMH editor Ben Hogwood said that it was " clear this isn't a return with an eye on the cash till … they have fire in their belly and music to stoke it with, and it shows in the depth of emotion unleashed by this album". Pitchfork writer Joshua Klein said the band attempted to tackle their "crowd-pleasing roots and their subsequent experiments" at once with a "renewed sense of mirthfulness that cuts through much of the pretension".

Jeff Miers of The Buffalo News said the band "manages to conjure soundscapes that are quietly magnificent, grandiose anthems that seduce the listener slowly". He added that the record "demands to be listened to in one sitting, and repeatedly -- it attaches itself to the listener over time, and after a few listens". The Guardian's Caroline Sullivan said the album featured the band "in the rudest possible health", with Booth delivering his lyrics "with such quivering passion that it's hard not to be impressed". Josh Modell of Spin say the album was a "clear attempt to re-create their most commercial sound". He added that it wouldn't "wow today’s kids, but old fans will feel the requisite nostalgic rush". The Times writer Dan Cairns was critical of the "11 sanctimonious, declamatory, defiantly average and band-huggingly smug tracks featured here".Before adding, "if this lot represent the best, what on God's earth were the other 109 like?"

Hey Ma reached number 10 on the UK album chart. In a 2018 interview, Glennie considered it one of the band's best releases, praising the songwriting as being "incredible"; he said Fontana's owner Universal Music Group "didn't have a lot of enthusiasm for the band, and the album got a soft release".

== Track listing ==
All words by Tim Booth, all tracks written by Booth, Larry Gott and Jim Glennie.

1. "Bubbles" – 5:23
2. "Hey Ma" – 4:10
3. "Waterfall" – 5:10
4. "Oh My Heart" – 3:43
5. "Boom Boom" – 4:15
6. "Semaphore" – 3:46
7. "Upside" – 4:27
8. "Whiteboy" – 2:49
9. "72" – 3:39
10. "Of Monsters & Heroes & Men" – 4:36
11. "I Wanna Go Home" – 4:21

iTunes bonus track

12. "Child to Burn" – 4:53

== Personnel ==
Personnel per booklet.

James

- Tim Booth – lead vocals
- Jim Glennie – bass guitars
- Larry Gott – electric, acoustic, slide and e-bow guitars; additional backing vocals (tracks 3 and 7)
- Saul Davies – electric, acoustic and baritone guitars; violin, additional drums (tracks 3 and 6)
- Mark Hunter – keyboards, programming
- David Baynton-Power – drums, percussion
- Andy Diagram – trumpet, flugelhorn, additional backing vocals (track 10)

Additional musicians

- KK – programming
- Lee Muddy Baker – additional backing vocals (tracks 3, 7, 9 and 11), additional drums (track 4), percussion (tracks 9 and 11), acoustic guitar (track 10), electric guitar (track 11)
- Rob Kenny – drums (track 11)

Production

- Lee Muddy Baker – producer, mixing (tracks 4–6, 9 and 10)
- James – producer, art direction
- Ben Caro – engineer
- KK – vocal engineer
- Danton Supple – mixing (tracks 1–3, 7, 8 and 11)
- Jonathon Shakhovskay – mixing (tracks 4–6, 9 and 10)
- Chris Potter – mastering
- Love – artwork original concept
- Antony Crook – photography
- Julian Ward – Warsky photography

== Charts ==
Chart performance for Hey Ma
Chart (2008)	Peak position
UK Albums (Official Charts)	10

== See also ==
- List of anti-war songs
