= Péter Vácz =

Hungarian animator and film director (born 1988)

- Born: July 2, 1988 (age 38); Budapest
- Education: Secondary School of Visual Arts Moholy-Nagy University of Art and Design, Budapest
- Occupations: Animator, film director
- Awards: Annecy International Animation Film Festival (Junior Jury Award) Nashville Film Festival ( Best Animated Short) Atlanta Film Festival (Best Animated Short)
- Website: www.petervacz.com

Péter Vácz (Budapest, July 2, 1988) is a Hungarian animator and film director based in Budapest. He uses 2D and 3D stop-motion animation techniques to produce short films, including music videos.

== Early years, studies ==
Péter Vácz was born in Budapest, Hungary, to a glass designer father, in whose workshop he started tinkering as a child. At the age of nine he started studying music and from 2003 he went to the 'Kisképző' Secondary School of Visual Arts, where he graduated in graphic design. Vácz then continued his studies at Moholy-Nagy University of Art and Design, where he took a puppet animation course.

During his university years, in 2010, he completed the Animations Sans Frontieres (ASF) international animation course, and in 2011, within the Erasmus Programme, he also finished the professional 3D animation training course at The Animation Workshop in Viborg, Denmark.

Vácz graduated with BA and MA in animation, his diploma films, the first in 2010 the Patakiskola (Streamschool) and Nyuszi és Őz (Rabbit and Deer) in 2012. These films have brought him to the forefront of international attention. The latter is a 16-minute film that uses a mixture of 2D and 3D animation and garnered 125 awards at international festivals, including the Junior Jury Award at the Annecy International Animation Film Festival and Best Animated Short at the Nashville Film Festival and Atlanta Film Festival.

== Career ==
Vácz co-founded the international film collective Caravel Collective, with which he made experimental films in the South of France for a year from summer 2013.

In 2014, Vácz was commissioned by Picasso Pictures, who had noted his Streamschool film, to create a music video for the song "All I'm Saying" by British band James. The project had a three-week deadline. The resulting stop-motion puppet video premiered on The Quietus, which praised Vácz's "excellent, darkly uplifting handiwork", and garnered a Best Animation nomination for the 2015 Berlin Music Video Awards.

After the experimental period in France, Vácz spent a year in Berlin as a freelancer, and moved back to Budapest in 2015. In addition to his professional and artistic work, he started teaching animation practice and theory at his alma mater, the Moholy-Nagy University of Art and Design. After several years of teaching, in 2019 he became the artistic director of the Illyés Művészeti Szakképző Akadémia.

External videos
- The Making of: James – Dear John

In 2016, Vácz collaborated with Joseph Wallace on another James music video, for the track "Dear John". Vácz and Wallace had met as students on the Animation Sans Frontières (ASF) animation course and have collaborated on a number of projects over the years, as well as teaching stop-motion animation together. "Dear John" used 3D animation with 2D flashback sequences. It, too, was nominated for the Berlin Music Video Awards.

More recent projects by Vácz include a psychedelic music video for Hungarian kids' band Szagos Hörigekkók, the live-action short film Pillowface – chronicling a man's playful attempts to combat hotel-room loneliness – and the semi-autobiographical animation project Noah's Tree.

In 2025, Vácz released the 21-minute short film Dog Ear (Hungarian Kutyafül) in 2D drawn style. The film premiered at the Annecy International Animation Film Festival and won a Special Mention at the Manchester Animation Festival.
