= James (band) =

English rock band

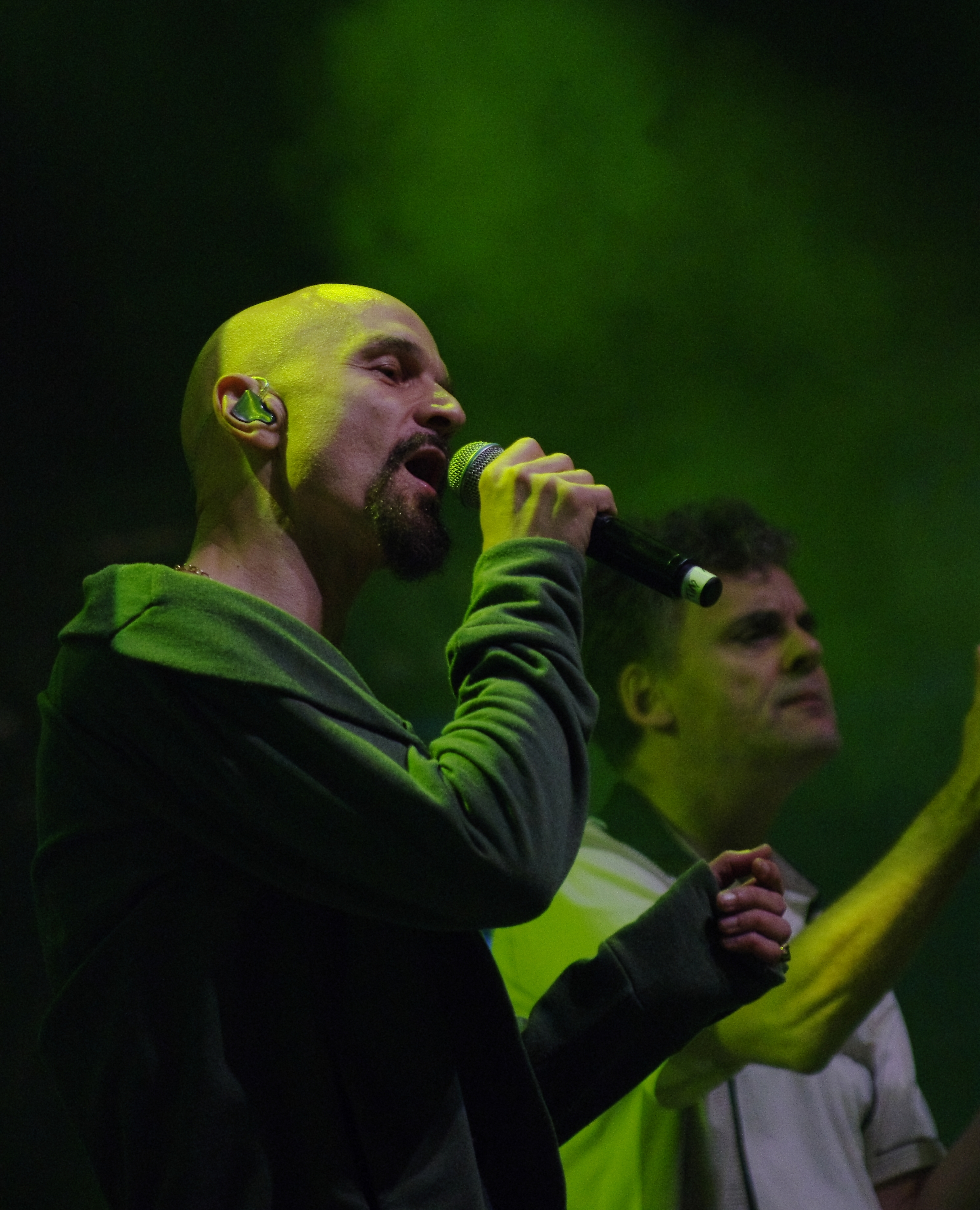
- James performing at the Haldern Pop Festival in 2013

Background information
- Origin: Whalley Range, Manchester, England
- Genres: Indie pop; Madchester; alternative rock; Britpop
- Works: James discography
- Years active: 1982–2001, 2007–present
- Labels: Factory; Sire; Rough Trade; Fontana; Mercury; Sanctuary; Decca; Cooking Vinyl; BMG; Nothing But Love; Virgin
- Members: Jim Glennie; Tim Booth; David Baynton-Power; Saul Davies; Mark Hunter; Andy Diagram; Adrian Oxaal; Chloe Alper; Debbie Knox-Hewson
- Past members: Paul Gilbertson; Gavan Whelan; Larry Gott; Michael Kulas
- Website: wearejames.com

James are an English rock band from Manchester, formed in 1982. They achieved popularity during the 1990s, with four top-10 hits on the UK Singles Chart and nine top-10 placings on the UK Albums Chart. The band's best-known singles include "Come Home", "Sit Down", "She's a Star" and "Laid".

Following the departure of lead singer Tim Booth in 2001, the band became inactive, but members reunited in January 2007 and have since released a further seven albums. Live performance has continually remained a central part of the band's output. As of 2010, the band had sold more than 25 million albums worldwide.

== History ==
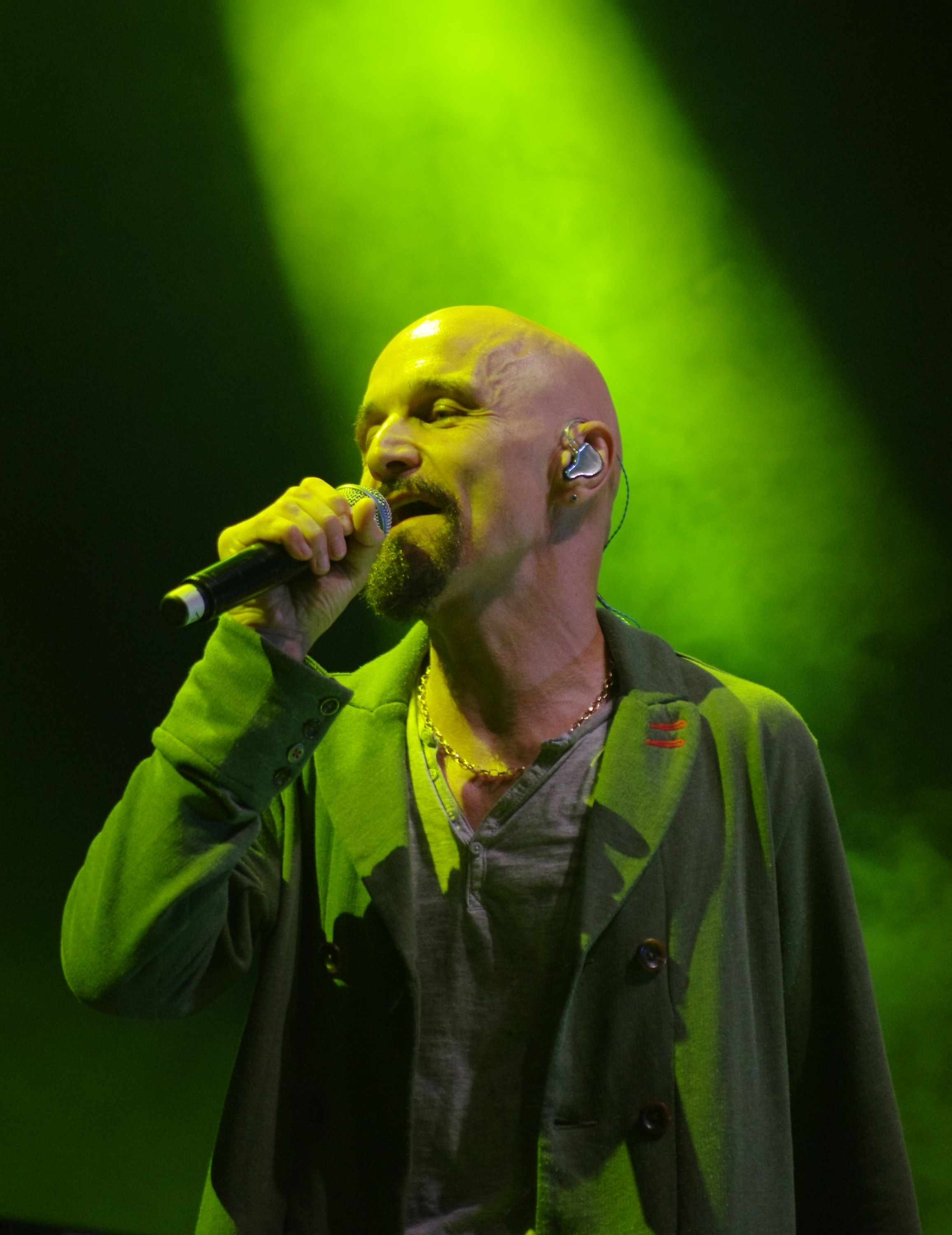
Tim Booth at Haldern Pop 2013

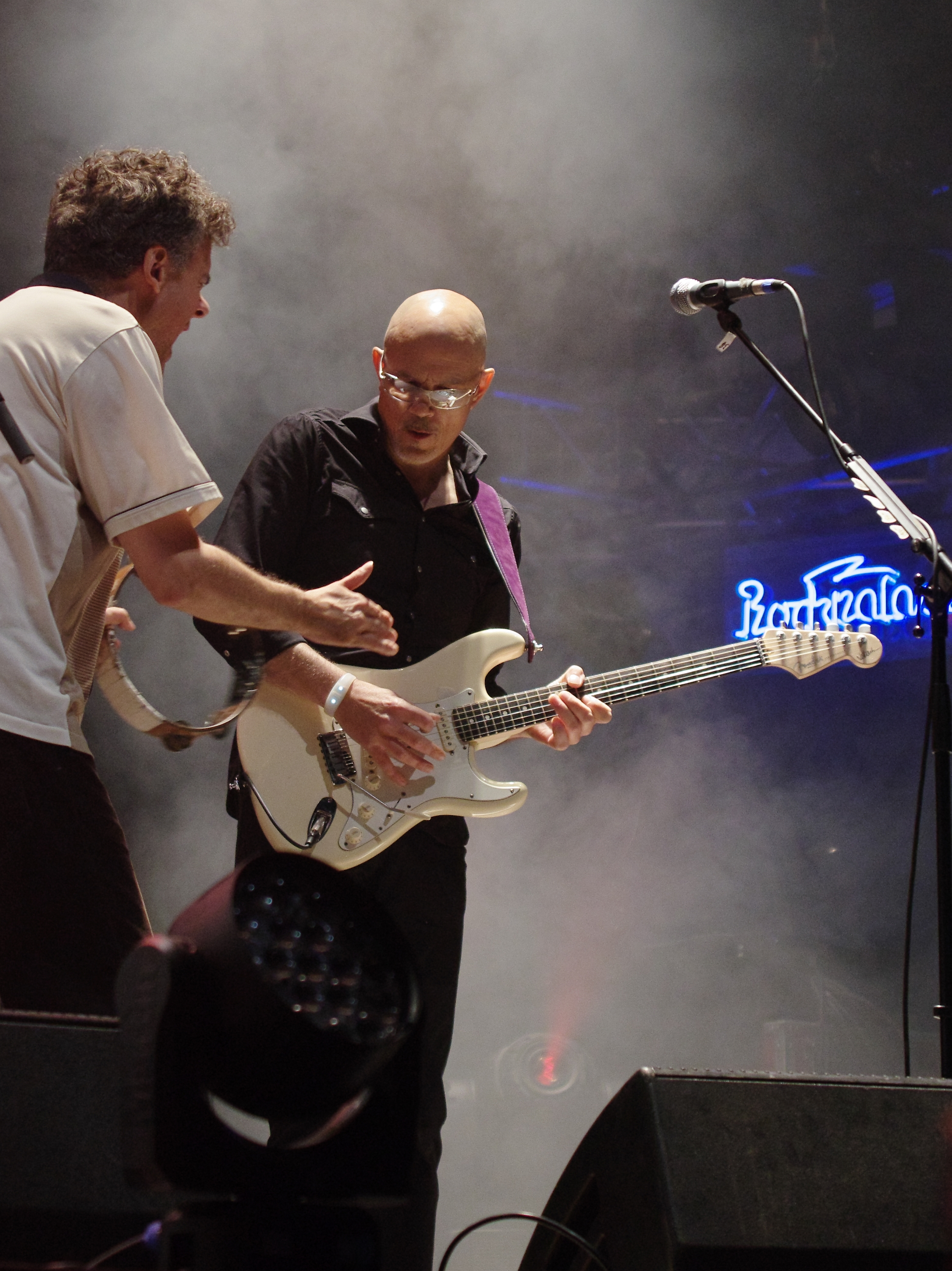
Larry Gott

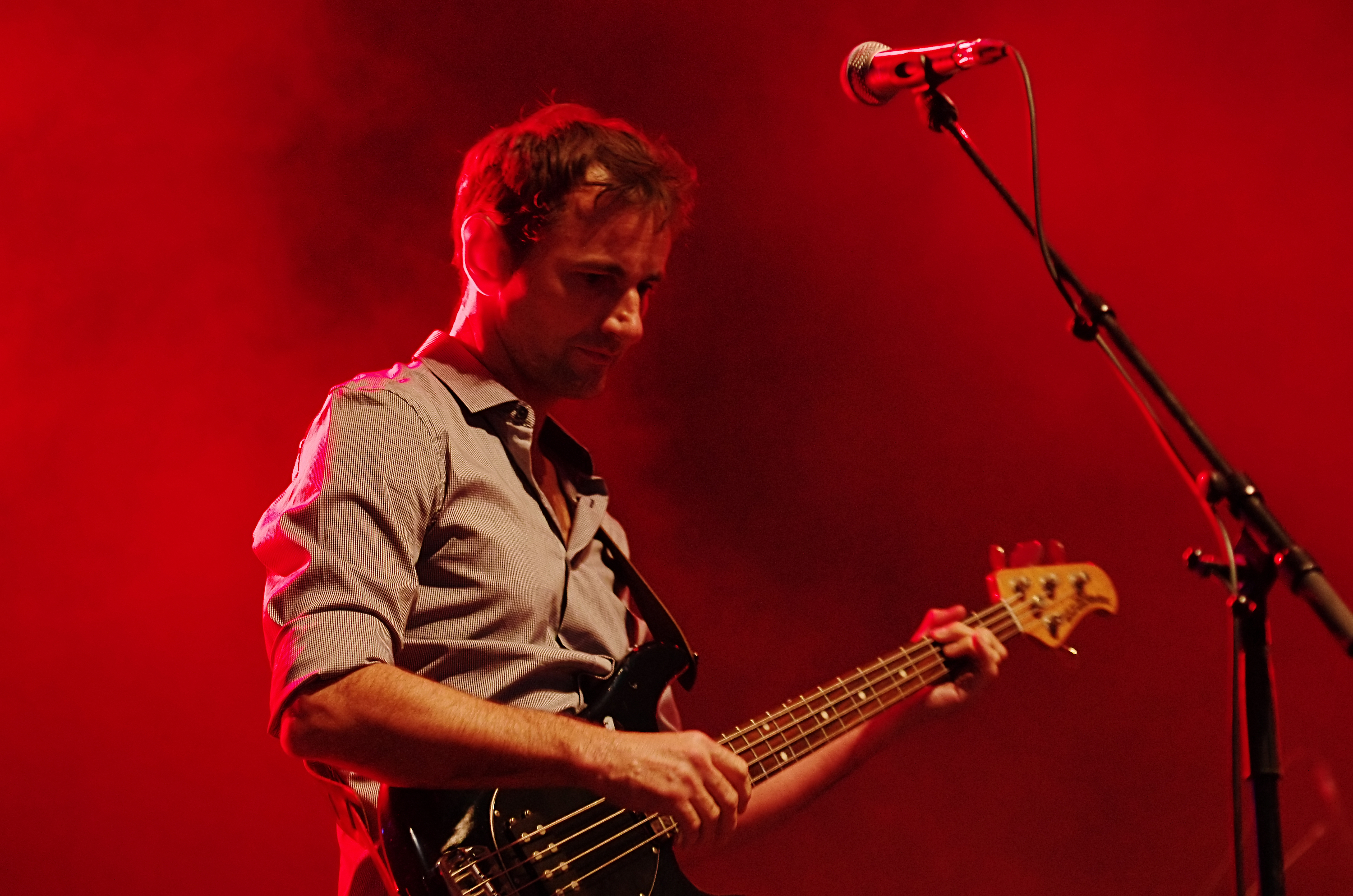
Jim Glennie

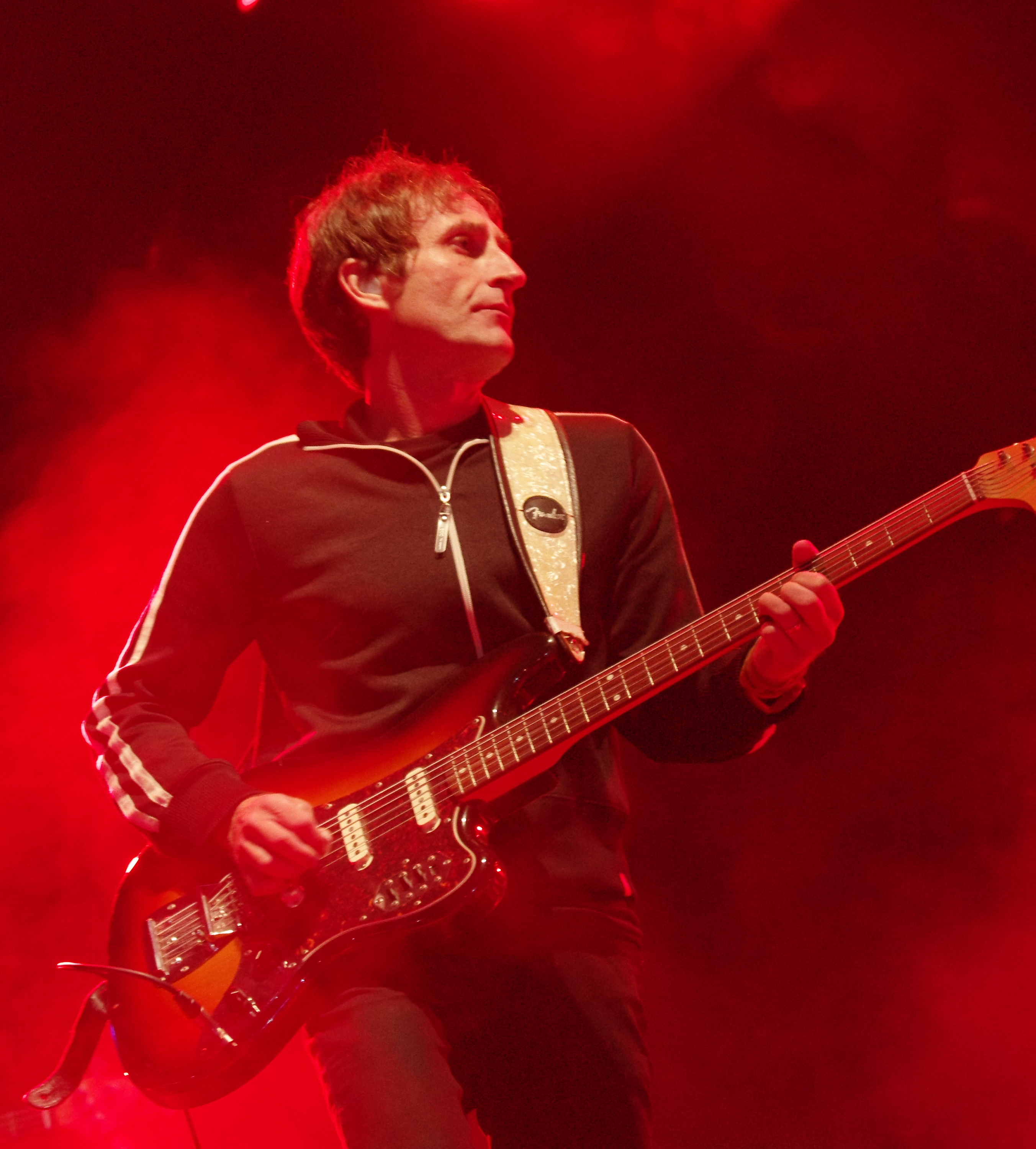
Saul Davies

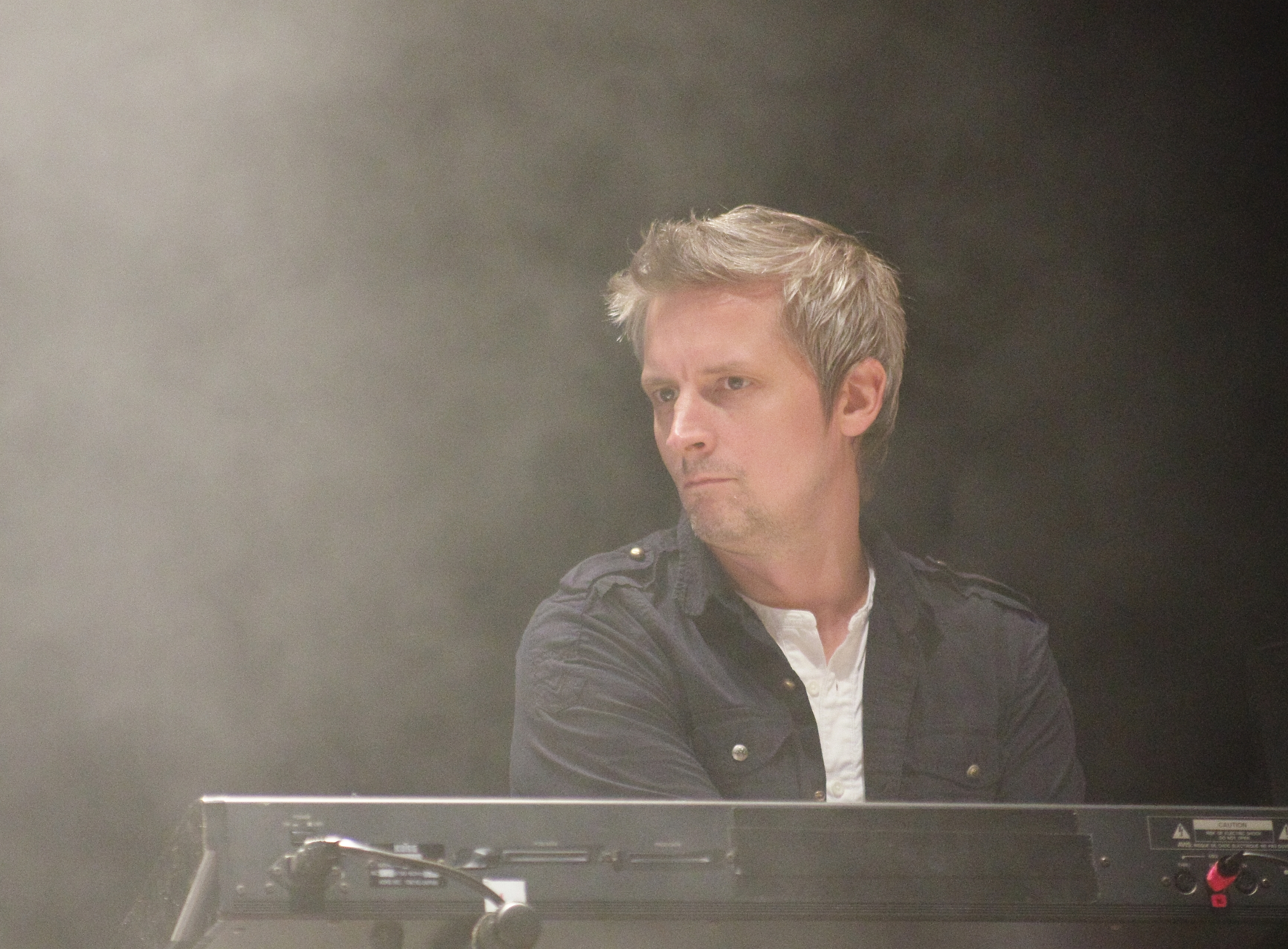
Mark Hunter

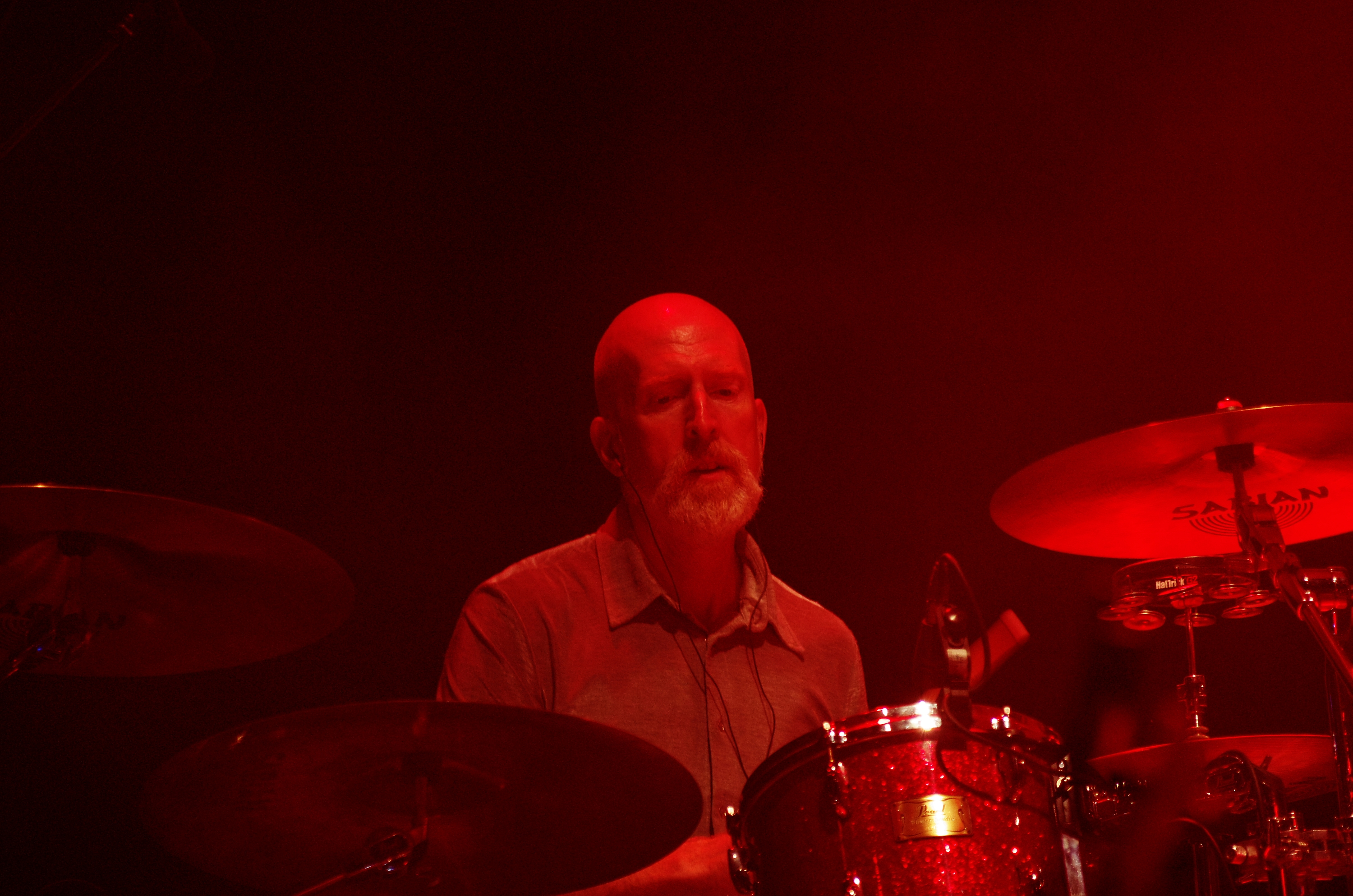
Dave Baynton-Power

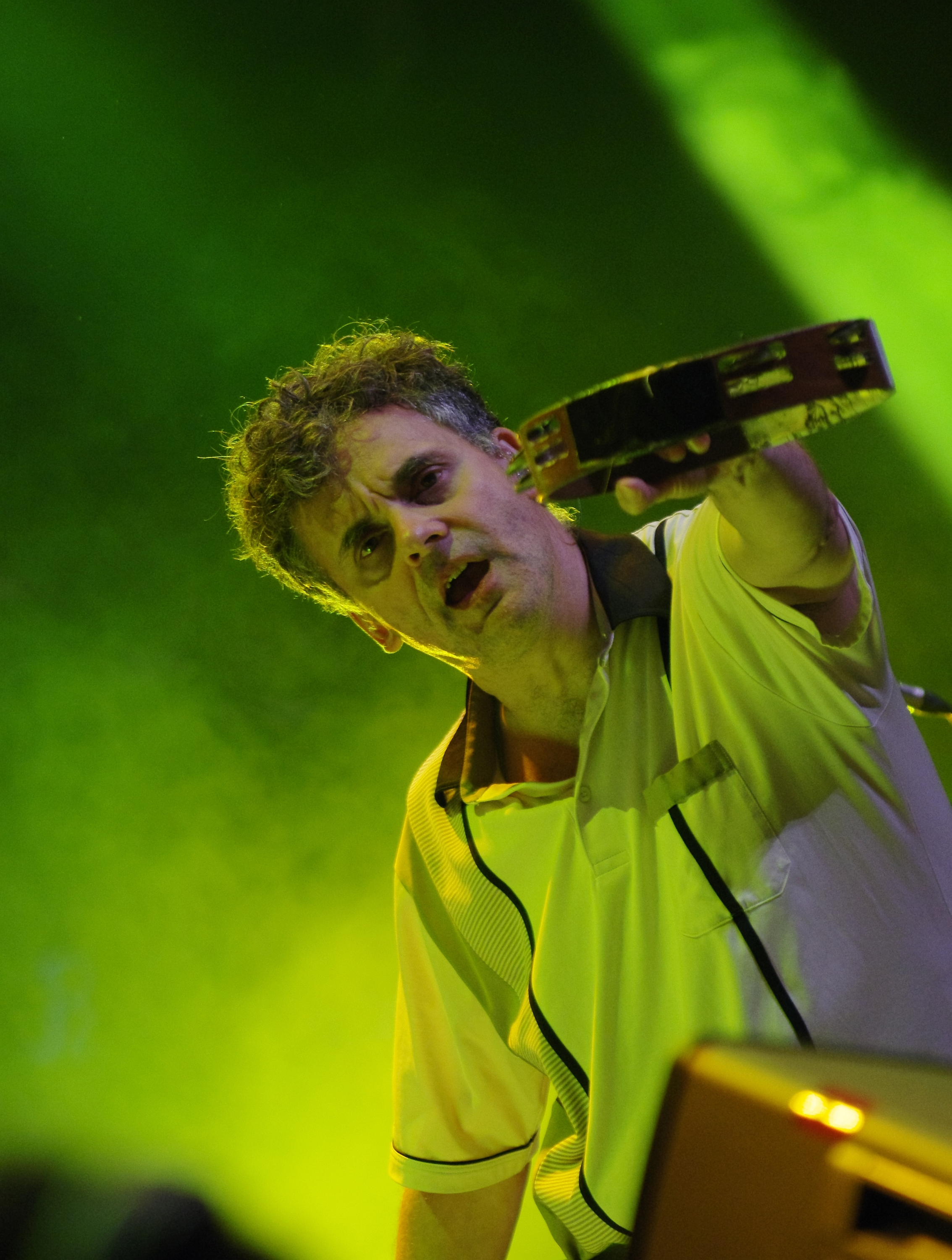
Andy Diagram

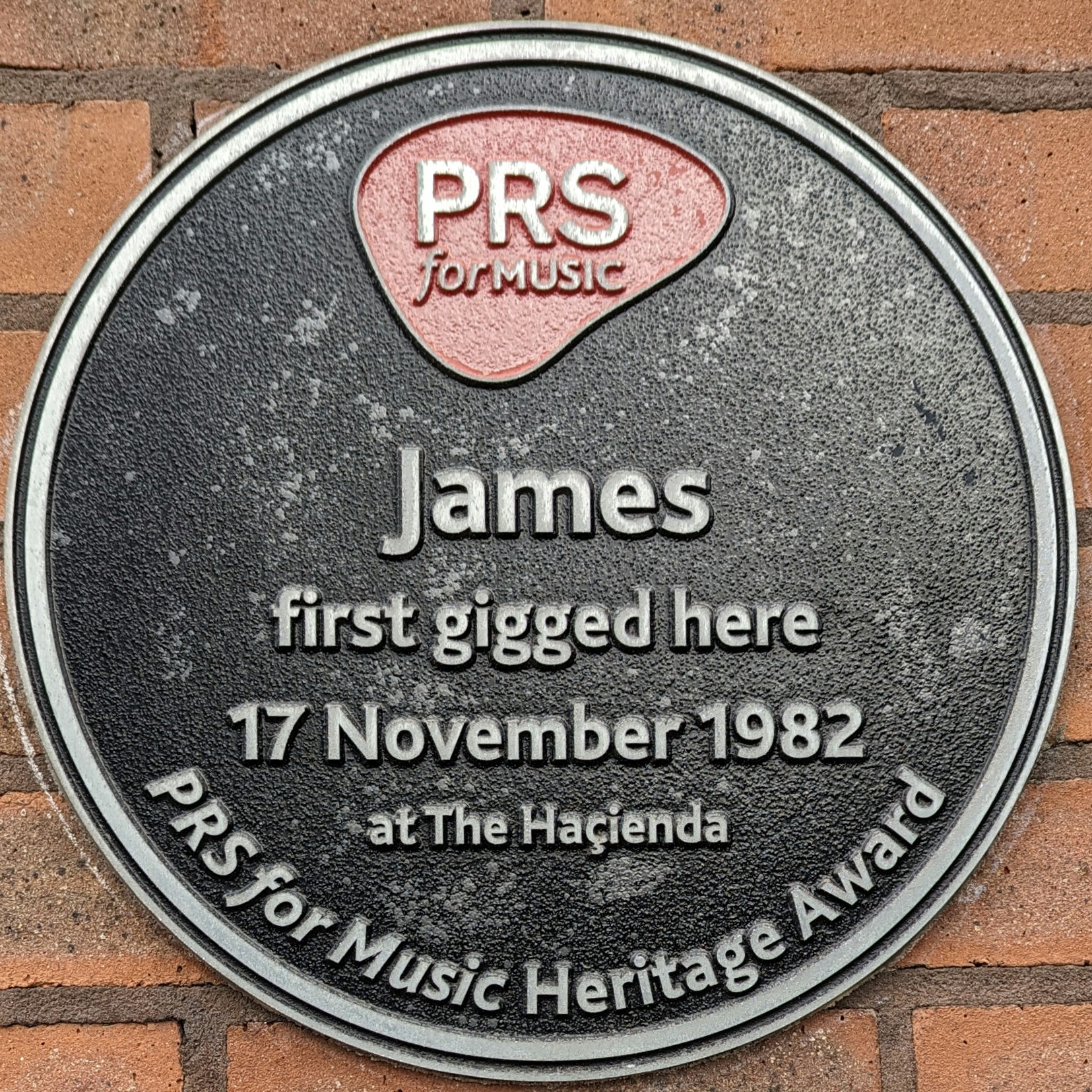
Plaque commemorating James first gig at The Haçienda in 1982 from PRS for Music

=== Formation and early releases: 1982–1987 ===
James were formed in 1982 in Whalley Range, Manchester, when Paul Gilbertson persuaded his friend Jim Glennie to buy a bass guitar and form a band with him. Their line-up solidified when Gavan Whelan joined on drums. They played a string of gigs under the names Venereal and the Diseases and Volume Distortion before settling on the name of Model Team International, then shortened to Model Team. They performed mostly improvised material derived from jam sessions, supporting the Fall at an early gig at Manchester Polytechnic. Vocalists and other musicians drifted rapidly in and out of their line-up until the band encountered Tim Booth at a student disco. Gilbertson invited him to the band's scout hut in Withington to join the band as a dancer; he was soon promoted to lead singer.

In August 1982, after a brief period under the name Tribal Outlook, the band renamed themselves James, after Glennie. As Glennie later said: "No one ever calls me James, so I don't associate it with my name in that respect. We couldn't use Tim because he's the singer and that would be weird. Our drummer was called Gavan, and we thought it sounded too 'heavy metal,' and the other one was Paul, so it was either James or Paul, so we went with James. It didn't seem like a big deal at the time we just thought, "Cool let's call the band 'James.'"

On 17 November 1982, on the recommendation of Mike Pickering, James played a gig at Manchester nightclub the Haçienda with New Order, the Durutti Column, Section 25 and others. The show was filmed and released on video in 1983 by Factory Records as "A Factory Outing", but during the editing process at Factory's offices, it caught the attention of Factory's co-founder, Tony Wilson. He offered James an album deal with Factory, but the band, by now a settled live act, were worried about tarnishing their material in the studio and settled instead for a three-track EP. Their debut release, the Jimone EP, was recorded at Strawberry Studios, Stockport, in August 1983 and released on Factory Records in September. It led to the band providing support for the Smiths between February and April 1985 on the Meat is Murder tour. The Smiths covered James's "What's The World" track during this tour.

Although they were now being touted as the "next big thing", several complex issues slowed their progress. Gilbertson's drug problems presented the band with no choice but to ask him to leave. Booth and Glennie had joined a sect named Lifewave that imposed many restrictions on their lifestyle and threatened the band's stability. The band's second EP, James II, was released over a year after the first and accompanied by a feature on the cover of the NME, Gilbertson having been replaced by the band's guitar tutor Larry Gott. The first two EPs would later be collected as Village Fire. Reviews were once again positive, and Factory were eager for James to record an album with it, but the band believed Factory were purely image-based and left the label, striking a deal with Sire Records.

Their third release, the Sit Down EP (no relation to the song of that name), came out in February 1986 and was followed by their debut album, Stutter, in July of that year. The album reached number 68 in the UK Albums Chart. Low on money and lacking coverage and promotion, the band recorded their second album, Strip-mine, attempting a more conventional song structure in an attempt to please Sire. The album almost went unreleased, but after a slight remix to sound more radio-friendly, Sire released it in September 1988, over a year after its initial completion. However the album only reached number 90. After finding a clause for ending their contract, the band left Sire.

James had by this point earned themselves a reputation as a live act and had built a solid fanbase. Sales of James T-shirts were particularly successful in Manchester even before they reached the Top 40. James financed the production of One Man Clapping, recorded live at Bath's Moles nightclub, with a bank loan from RBS and the help of Rough Trade Records. The album went to number 1 in the indie charts in 1989, reinvigorating media interest in the band.

=== Line-up changes and success: 1988–1992 ===
In November 1988, drummer Whelan became involved in an on-stage fight with Booth and was asked to leave the band. He was replaced by David Baynton-Power a few months later. During the following year James greatly expanded their line-up and sound palette by hiring three new members: guitarist-violinist-percussionist Saul Davies (whom Gott recruited from an amateur blues night), keyboard player Mark Hunter, and trumpeter/percussionist Andy Diagram (the latter a noted avant-garde and pop musician who had played with The Diagram Brothers, Dislocation Dance, The Cotton Singers and Pale Fountains). This new seven-piece line-up went into the studio to record the third James album.

New singles "Sit Down" and "Come Home" became strong hits in the independent charts, and the latter featured on the compilation album Happy Daze. The album Gold Mother was intended to be released on Rough Trade but the owner of the label, Geoff Travis, believed James could only reach an audience of 20,000 to 30,000. The band believed they had more potential than this and bought the rights to the album from Rough Trade. A successful winter tour in 1989 attracted a deal with Fontana Records, and the band ended a difficult decade on an optimistic note.

Gold Mother was released in June 1990 just as the 'Madchester' movement, with its wave of popular Manchester-based indie bands, brought James to public attention and won them mainstream recognition. Singles "How Was It for You," the remixed "Come Home" and "Lose Control" all made the Top 40, and the band's newfound success was re-affirmed when they played two sold-out dates at the Manchester G-Mex at the end of the year. In March 1991, the popularity of "Sit Down" led to a re-recorded version being released as a single, which reached number 2 in the UK Singles Chart. Gold Mother was re-released to include "Sit Down" and previous single "Lose Control", and the album sold ten times more copies than Travis originally predicted. The song became one of the biggest-selling singles of the year.

The band members spent the rest of the year recording their next album, Seven, which was released in February 1992. It reached number 2 in the UK Albums Chart (its lead single, "Sound", had followed "Sit Down" into the top 10 a few months earlier) and earned the band some recognition in the US as they embarked on their first Stateside tour. The band's activities culminated in a sold-out show to 30,000 people at the Alton Towers theme park in July, broadcast live on BBC Radio 1, following which Andy Diagram left the group.

=== Subsequent releases: 1993–2001 ===
In 1993, James were invited on an acoustic tour of the US supporting Neil Young at a series of natural outdoor venues in the autumn. They returned to England refreshed and ready to record their new album with Brian Eno, whom they had originally approached to produce Stutter but who had been unavailable at the time. Eno set about bringing out the ambience in James's music, and took them through a recording process that the band later described as a "journey of self-discovery". The process resulted in not one but two albums: the "song" album Laid and the experimental Wah Wah, which showcased the band's improvised jams recorded on the spot then mixed by Eno. Booth's vocals were then added to the results.

Laid was released in September 1993 to positive reviews. As well as being a success in the UK, the album also broke the band in the US, shipping over 600,000 copies and charting at number 72 in the Billboard 200, propelled by the popularity of the single "Laid" on US college radio. The band spent most of 1994 touring the States. Wah Wah was eventually released in September 1994 to a lukewarm reception.

The recording of the follow-up album faced difficulties from the start. Two key members of the James organization resigned: guitarist and key composer Larry Gott (who left the group in order to spend more time with his family) and manager Martine McDonagh (who had had a sometimes fraught romantic relationship with Booth, resulting in a son, Ben). Booth announced that he also wished to take a break in order to record an album with Angelo Badalamenti. In 1995 the band discovered they owed a £250,000 tax bill.

Determined to continue despite the setbacks, the band set up studio in Baynton-Power's house. Former Sharkboy guitarist Adrian Oxaal was drafted in to replace Gott on guitar, while Booth returned periodically from the States to add his vocals. 1996 saw the release of Booth's album with Badalamenti (Booth and the Bad Angel). The new James album, Whiplash, followed in February 1997. The album proved a successful comeback, reaching the UK top 10, as did the single "She's a Star".

The band toured to promote the album, recruiting Michael Kulas as rhythm guitarist while in the States. Booth suffered a neck injury while dancing on stage in the US, resulting in a series of tour dates being cancelled as he underwent emergency surgery, and the band being offered a place instead on the Lollapalooza tour. In March 1998, a greatest hits album, The Best Of, was released, compiling all the band's hits since their signing to Fontana. The album reached number 1 in the UK Albums Chart, and sold-out tours throughout the year followed.

The band then returned to the studio to begin work on their next album, Millionaires, which was released in October 1999. The album did not reach the phenomenal sales level predicted, but still entered the UK Albums Chart at number 2, and sold over 150,000 copies.

After the disappointing performance of Millionaires the band chose to start anew in their approach to their next album, working with Eno once again. They spent most of 2000 recording the album; writing the songs, then performing them live before actually recording them. They embarked on a small-scale tour in the autumn of that year on which their set lists consisted almost entirely of new material. The album, Pleased To Meet You, was released in July 2001. The album's artwork featured a composite image of the faces of all the band members to create a new person. The album reached only number 11, the lowest position for a James studio album since their signing to Fontana.

=== Break-up and other projects: 2002–2006 ===
Shortly after their last album release, James reached the end of their contract, and Tim Booth announced he was leaving the band to concentrate on other projects of his own. They played a farewell tour of the UK at the end of the year. Their final hometown gig, at the Manchester Evening News arena on 7 December, was recorded for a live CD and DVD, Getting Away With It... Live. Past members Larry Gott and Andy Diagram rejoined them for the tour, and Brian Eno also joined them onstage at London's Wembley Arena during the tour. The albums Gold Mother, Laid, and Whiplash (each containing bonus tracks) were re-released by Mercury Records the following year, as well as a B-sides compilation entitled B-Sides Ultra.

A planned compilation of material from the band's Factory and Sire years was announced in 2001, but the album, Strange Dancing, was never released. The first two James albums, Stutter and Strip-mine, were re-pressed in June 2007, but without any additional rarities. Booth continued as a solo artist in 2004 with the release of his solo album Bone, co-written and produced by Lee Muddy Baker. A new compilation album, The Collection was released in late 2004, and Seven – The Live Concert (a DVD version of a previously released video) in 2005.

=== Reunion: 2007–present ===
In January 2007 singer Tim Booth's personal website announced that "Tim will be rejoining James in early 2007 for a series of live shows to be announced very soon". At the same time, James's old website was replaced by a new domain holder at wearejames.com. The site confirmed the line-up as that which recorded the album Laid: Booth, Gott, Glennie, Davies, Hunter and Baynton-Power. Booth confirmed in interviews that he became convinced to rejoin the band after meeting up with Glennie and Gott the previous November for a jamming session, out of which new songs were born.

The initial five dates of the tour were expanded to seven on the day tickets went on sale (26 January) due to high demand; the whole tour had sold out by close of business. The tour took place during late April 2007, and was followed later in the year by more live shows, including festival appearances at T in the Park and V Festival. The band also appeared at Summercase, Barcelona's top music concert in Spain during July 2007. Andy Diagram also rejoined the band as trumpet player during the festival tour. April saw the release of a new compilation album, Fresh as a Daisy — The Singles, accompanied by a DVD compilation of all the band's promo videos.

The new album Hey Ma was released on 7 April 2008, peaking at number 10 on the UK Albums Chart, and a three-week tour to promote the album commenced on 10 April 2008. An arena tour of the UK called "We Are Sound" followed in December, on which two new songs ("Porcupine" and "Look Away") were previewed as tasters for a new studio album. A live album, Live in 2008, with a selection of songs recorded during the 2008 spring tour was exclusively sold at the merchandise stalls of the "We Are Sound" tour, and was limited to 5000 copies.

The band announced plans to release two mini-albums by April 2010. The Night Before was released on 19 April, although its follow-up, The Morning After, was released later than expected, on 2 August 2010. Following the release of The Night Before, the band embarked on a UK tour, the Mirrorball Tour, premièring songs from the album. Another UK tour took place in December. Both this tour and the US release of both mini-albums together as a 2-CD set called The Morning After The Night Before. A 19-date North American tour began in September to promote the combined album as well as showcase the songs before the UK tour.

At the beginning of 2011, Tim Booth announced that he was working on some new solo material, although James remained active, participating in the Lollapalooza festival in Chile. The band appeared at the Coachella Valley Music and Arts Festival on 13 and 20 April in Indio, California and Hard Rock Calling 2011 on 24 June in Hyde Park, London, where they were joined by Kaiser Chiefs and the headline act, the Killers. Towards the end of 2011, James signalled a departure from their previous touring style, with the announcement of a series of dates in October and November of that year including an orchestra and a choir. This short, ten date tour saw James performing their back catalogue accompanied by the Orchestra of the Swan and the Manchester Consort Choir. They played at Kendal Calling Festival 2012 and toured again in 2013.

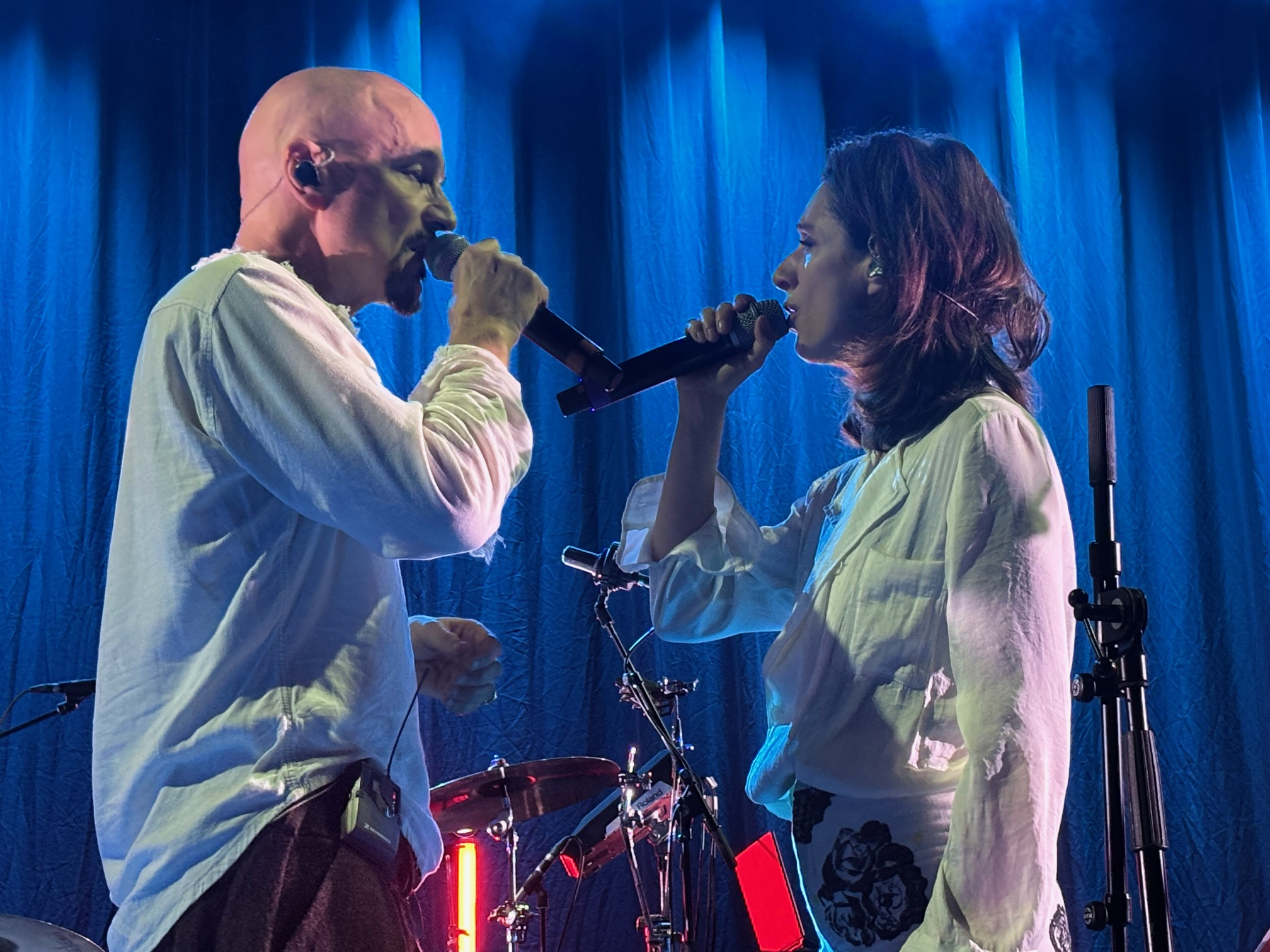
Tim Booth and Chloe Alper perform with James at Union Transfer in Philadelphia on their 2025 tour.

James's first new album in six years, La Petite Mort, was released on 2 June 2014 along with a promo single "Moving On". In July 2014, the band headlined on the Castle Stage for Camp Bestival at Lulworth Castle in Dorset and announced a ten date UK tour starting on 10 November, preceded by an 11 October headlining of the entertainment at the Rugby league Super League grand final at Old Trafford, performing a set before the game and in the half time show.

They toured again in 2015, playing some shows without Larry Gott, who was taking a break from touring: Adrian Oxaal re-joined the band for the duration of the tour (with the former Oceansize guitarist Mike Vennart covering for him for one show at Bingley Live), and would subsequently replace Gott in the active lineup. Keyboard technician Ron Yeadon, formerly of Unkle Bob, also appeared on stage, singing backing vocals; he later joined the band as a backing vocalist. In 2016, the album Girl at the End of the World was released, with an accompanying tour – building up to the band's planned appearance opening 2016's Glastonbury Festival (the Other Stage) and later taking a top spot at the On Blackheath festival in September.

In May 2018, James released a four-song EP, Better Than That, that reached number 1 of the Vinyl Singles Chart, and embarked on a sold-out UK tour to promote it. During this tour, they also previewed a few songs from their following album, Living in Extraordinary Times, released on 3 August 2018. Percussionist and backing vocalist Deborah Knox-Hewson joined the band during the tour, replacing Ron Yeadon. She left the band shortly after the album's release and was replaced by Chloe Alper.

The band's 16th studio album, All the Colours of You, was released on 4 June 2021 on new label Virgin Music Label & Artists Services. The album has eleven tracks and was produced by Jacknife Lee.

In December 2022 the band announced a UK tour with a live orchestra for 2023 to coincide with their 40th anniversary. On 23 March 2023 the band announced the release of their 17th studio album, Be Opened by the Wonderful, for 9 June 2023. The album is an all acoustic, orchestral re-working of hit singles plus the track "Love Make a Fool".

On 29 September 2023, the band announced a UK tour in June 2024 in support of their 18th studio album, with Razorlight supporting. On 15 January 2024, the band debuted their new single "Is This Love" from their 18th studio album, Yummy, which was released on 12 April 2024.

On 8 November 2024 a summer tour of the UK was announced, with support from Happy Mondays, Razorlight, Shed Seven and others, as well as the forthcoming release of a new live album and DVD, James, Live at the Acropolis.

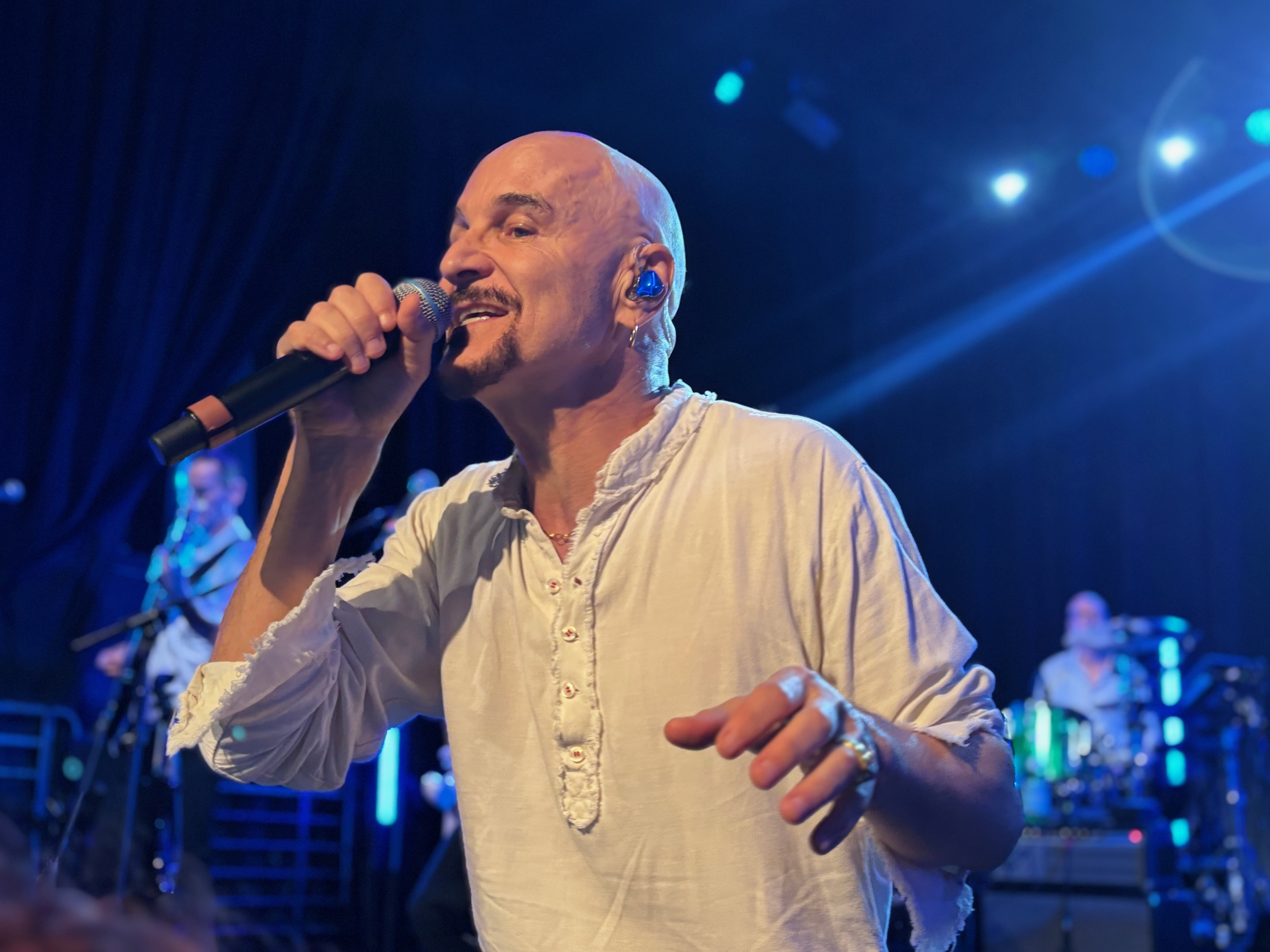
James lead singer Tim Booth at Union Transfer in Philadelphia on September 7, 2025.

In 2025, James played their first headline tour in the United States in 15 years. The tour consists of 18 headline dates, plus festival appearances and runs from early September through early October. During each show, the band will play their entire "Laid" album plus other hits and rarities. In early shows, the band played the "Laid" album in order, but as the tour got started, they changed their plan and played all songs from the album "Laid" throughout the concert. Each show consisted of two sets, approximately one hour each, with a 20-minute break between sets. The tour received positive reviews from fans and critics, citing the nine-musician lineup and fantastic performance of frontman Tim Booth.

On 7 October 2025 James announced the release of Nothing But Love, a 3 disc career-spanning boxset, along with a 2026 UK arena tour. On 8 October 2025 Wake Up Superman, a new song from the boxset was released.

== Members ==
Current members

- Jim Glennie – bass guitar, backing vocals (1982–2001, 2007–present)
- Tim Booth – lead vocals (1982–2001, 2007–present)
- David Baynton-Power – drums, percussion (1988–2001, 2007–present)
- Saul Davies – rhythm guitar, acoustic guitar, violin, percussion, backing vocals (1989–2001, 2007–present)
- Mark Hunter – keyboards, piano, programming (1989–2001, 2007–present)
- Andy Diagram – trumpet, percussion, backing vocals (1989–1992, 2001, 2007–present)
- Adrian Oxaal – lead guitar, cello (1995–2001, 2015–present)
- Deborah Knox-Hewson – drums, percussion, backing vocals (2018 touring, 2021–present)
- Chloe Alper – backing vocals, percussion (2018–present)

Former members

- Gavan Whelan – drums, piano, backing vocals (1982–1988)
- Paul Gilbertson – guitars (1982–1985)
- Larry Gott – lead guitar, acoustic guitar, keyboards, flute, backing vocals (1985–1995, 2001, 2007–2015)
- Michael Kulas – rhythm guitar, backing vocals (1997–2001)

Former touring and session members

- Ron Yeadon – backing vocals, percussion (2014–2017)

Timeline

== Awards and nominations ==
Year	Awards	Work	Category	Result
1991	Silver Clef Award	Themselves	Best Newcomer	Won
1991	Smash Hits Poll Winners Party	Themselves	Smash Hits/Radio One Award for Best New Group	Nominated
1991	Smash Hits Poll Winners Party	Themselves	Best Indie Act	Nominated
1992	Ivor Novello Awards	"Sit Down"	Best Contemporary Song	Nominated
1992	Brit Awards	Themselves	British Group	Nominated
2008	UK Festival Awards	Themselves	Most Memorable Moment	Nominated
2010	UK Festival Awards	Beautiful Days	Best Headline Performance	Nominated
2012	Lunas del Auditorio	Themselves	Best Foreign Rock Artist	Nominated
2014	UK Music Video Awards	"Moving On"	Best Animation	Won
2014	UK Music Video Awards	"Moving On"	Best Rock/Indie Video – UK	Nominated
2014	AIM Independent Music Awards	"Moving On"	Independent Video of the Year	Nominated
2014	Ibiza Music Video Festival	"Moving On"	Best Visual Effects	Nominated
2015	Berlin Music Video Awards	"All I'm Saying"	Best Animation	Nominated
2017	Berlin Music Video Awards	"Dear John"	Best Animation	Nominated
2018	Best Art Vinyl	Living in Extraordinary Times	Best Art Vinyl	Nominated

== Discography ==
Studio albums

- Stutter (1986)
- Strip-mine (1988)
- Gold Mother (1990)
- Seven (1992)
- Laid (1993)
- Wah Wah (1994)
- Whiplash (1997)
- Millionaires (1999)
- Pleased to Meet You (2001)
- Hey Ma (2008)
- The Night Before (2010)
- The Morning After (2010)
- La Petite Mort (2014)
- Girl at the End of the World (2016)
- Living in Extraordinary Times (2018)
- All the Colours of You (2021)
- Be Opened by the Wonderful (2023)
- Yummy (2024)
