= Lee Muddy Baker =

Lee Baker
- Also known as: Muddy
- Born: 16 November 1969 (age 56)
- Origin: Watford, England
- Genres: Alternative rock, electronic
- Occupation: Singer-songwriter
- Instruments: Bass guitar, guitar, tabla
- Years active: 1989–present
- Labels: Eye Industries, Chrysalis
- Website: My Federation

Lee "Muddy" Baker (born 16 November 1969) is a UK-based singer-songwriter, producer, performer, vocalist and multi-instrumentalist.

== Biography ==
=== Early years ===
Lee Baker grew up in Watford, England where he attended Watford Boys' Grammar School. Having gained A-Levels in Art, Maths & Physics he went on to read Modern Art at the University of Newcastle upon Tyne, where he graduated in 1992. During his time at university, Baker formed and fronted his first band, called Cup of Sunshine.

=== Marbaker ===
Baker left Newcastle to settle in Brighton and it was here that he truly focused on forging a career in the music industry, forming a new 4-piece band, Marbaker. The new band soon proved hugely popular on the live music circuit. It was not long before Marbaker was signed to Chrysalis Music and toured the UK to promote the band's debut single "Hope You Find".

This first release received national radio airplay and the accolade of Melody Maker's Single of the Week as voted by the band Gomez. However, frustrated with the direction in which the band was going, Marbaker split up and the first album was never made.

=== Performer, writer & producer ===
After the breakup of Marbaker, Baker continued to perform, write and produce new material both for himself, other artists, including Mo Solid Gold and Chung King, and for TV programmes and advertising. In a move away from the more soulful and hypnotic beats of Marbaker, Baker co-wrote, performed and produced a clutch of club tunes under the guise of "Special Unit". The most successful of these was "Sights on You" which was hugely popular on the UK and Miami club scene, reaching number 1 in Pete Tong's BBC Radio 1 Buzz Chart in the UK.

Baker continues to work for and with others; he produced an acoustic remix of the hit single "Borderline" by Michael Gray and wrote the score for an episode of BBC Four's Arena series, celebrating 57 years of the BBC Radio 4 radio drama serial The Archers – a testament to Baker's breadth of musical capabilities.

=== Tim Booth & James ===
Baker teamed up with Tim Booth at the time the ex-front man of the band James. The two formed a strong friendship based on a chance meeting in Brighton which ultimately led to the release of the highly acclaimed album Bone, which was produced by Baker and written by Booth, Baker and KK (Kevin Kerrigan). The album artwork was also created by Baker. The band was called "Tim Booth and the Individuals", and toured the UK and the US and received much radio airplay, including the UK's Virgin Radio and BBC Radio 2 with Jonathan Ross. The band also appeared on TV on BBC Three and played to a packed crowd at the Glastonbury Festival. The album, although highly acclaimed, never achieved commercial success, and the band have moved on to pursue their individual interests. Tim Booth had a small part in the film Batman Begins and is writing a screenplay, but most notably is now back with James who announced their reformation in January 2007. Lisa Lindley Jones is embarking upon a solo career, and her first single "Firetime" was released in October 2006.

With James' reformation, Baker produced two new songs, followed by James's new album Hey Ma, which was released on 7 April 2008. He sings backing vocals for James on Hey Ma and also does so on "Not So Strong", an additional track released via the James website in 2009.

In 2011, Baker and Booth released their second collaboration album titled Love Life. It was released under Booth's name, but Baker produced, mixed, and performed on the recording, while co-writing many tracks on the album as well.

In 2024, Booth held a reading and Q&A session to promote the release of his novel When I Died for the First Time alongside comedian Troy Hawke. Baker was in attendance and played three live tracks - one from the book, one from Booth and the Bad Angel and one from Bone, alongside Booth's vocals and percussion by Hawke.

=== My Federation ===
Since the end of Tim Booth and the Individuals, Baker formed a new band, called My Federation. The band has released a debut album called Don't Wanna Die and an EP Honey Bee.

=== This Morning ===
After the departure of Fern Britton from ITV's This Morning in 2009, it was announced Holly Willoughby would take over her position along with a full graphic, logo and music rebrand. Baker was approached to rearrange the familiar signature tune, which needed updating after sixteen years on air. His rendition remained until 2013 when a new version premiered to celebrate the 25th Anniversary year, though this rendition was short lived and Baker's arrangement was reinstated for another year between 2014 and 2015.
