= Jim Glennie =

British musician

James Patrick Glennie
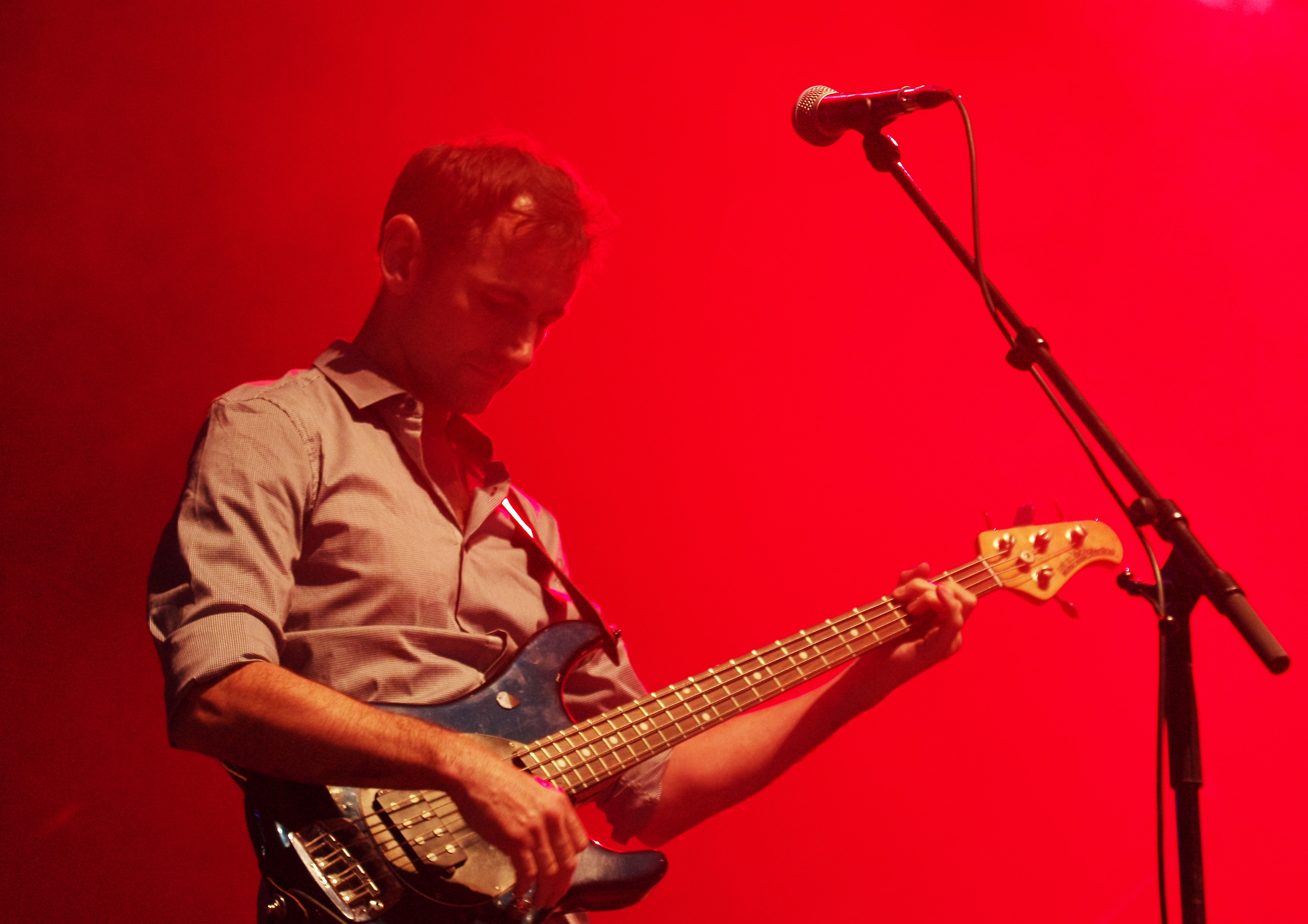
- Jim Glennie performing with James at Haldern Pop, 2013

Background information
- Also known as: Jim Glennie
- Born: 10 October 1963 (age 62); Moss Side, Manchester, UK
- Instrument: Bass guitar
- Years active: 1982–1982, 2007–present
- Member of: James

James Patrick Glennie (born 10 October 1963) is the bassist for and eponym of English rock band James. He is the band's longest-serving member—having been there from the first line-up through to the present day—and now only remaining original member.

He was born in Moss Side, Manchester. He never really had an interest in music in his youth, but his childhood best friend Paul Gilbertson managed to change his mind after convincing him to buy a bass guitar. Two weeks later they played their first concert at Eccles Royal British Legion club, in which their singer did not show up. Glennie offered himself up to sing instead, and the club manager pulled the plug halfway through their second song, demanding they stopped playing.
