= Millionaires (album) =

Studio album by James
- Released: 11 October 1999
- Recorded: May 1998 – February 1999
- Studio: Ridge Farm, Capel, Surrey; Hook End, Berkshire; Townhouse, London; Metropolis, London
- Genre: Indie rock, pop
- Length: 51:26
- Label: Mercury
- Producer: Brian Eno; Saul Davies; Mark Hunter; Steve Osborne; David Baynton-Power; Faithless

James chronology
The Best Of (1997)	Millionaires (1999)	Pleased to Meet You (2001)

Singles from Millionaires
- 1. "I Know What I'm Here For" Released: 19 July 1999; 2. "Just Like Fred Astaire" Released: 4 October 1999; 3. "We're Going to Miss You" Released: 13 December 1999

Millionaires is the eighth studio album by British alternative rock band James. During the Whiplash release cycle, guitarist Adrian Oxaal replaced founding member Larry Gott, and guitarist Michael Kulas joined the band. Touring to promote the release was cut short when Booth injured his neck. With the release of The Best Of in early 1998, the band began recording their next album in May 1998. The sessions continued into February 1999 at a variety of studios: Ridge Farm, Hook End, Townhouse and Metropolis. While Brian Eno produced most of the record, the producer credit was also given to guitarist/violinist Saul Davies, keyboardist Mark Hunter, Steve Osborne, drummer David Baynton-Power and Faithless. Millionaires is an indie rock and pop release that drew comparison to Lou Reed and New Radicals.

"I Know What I'm Here For" was released as a single in July 1999, followed by "Just Like Fred Astaire" in early October. Millionaires was released through Mercury Records on 11 October; initial promotion consisted of TV appearances, radio performances, listening parties and launch nights. In December they embarked on a UK tour, coinciding with the single release of "We're Going to Miss You". Millionaires reached number two in the UK album chart, and was certified gold by the BPI. On the UK singles chart, "I Know What I'm Here For" peaked at number 22, "Just Like Fred Astaire" reached number 17, and "We're Going to Miss You" peaked at number 48. Millionaires received a mainly favourable response from music critics, with many finding it an enjoyable album.

== Background ==
During the making of their seventh album Whiplash, James were struggling with intra-personal tension between the members, and vocalist Tim Booth was occupied recording an album with Angelo Badalamenti. The release of Whiplash in February 1997 saw a line-up shift: guitarist Adrian Oxaal replaced founding member Larry Gott, and guitarist Michael Kulas (who was a friend of guitarist/violinist Saul Davies) was brought into the fold. It reached number nine in the United Kingdom, while its three singles – "She's a Star", "Tomorrow", and "Waltzing Along" – became top 40 hits in that territory. However, in the United States, the album was a commercial failure. The subsequent tour in that territory was cancelled following three shows after Booth injured his neck in April. He had to stay horizontal for a week, and was ordered to rest for a minimum of six weeks.

As a result of this, the band's performances at the Glastonbury and V97 festivals in the UK were cancelled. Despite the injury not healing up by the end of the six weeks, the band visited the US again, this time as part of the Lollapalooza touring festival. To enable the band to work on material, their A&R person had recording equipment installed on their bus. Davies and keyboardist Mark Hunter said aside from a few occasions, the gear remained unused for the most part. Spurred on by insults from the audience, the band members spent more time drinking. Booth attempted to coax any of his bandmates into writing material; Davies was sober roughly once a week on the tour – Booth would enlist him as a writing partner on the back of their tour bus for a couple of hours at a time. Hunter, who managed to curtail his drinking for one month of the trek, occupied his time by attempting to write new material. The band appeared at Reading Festival with Booth in a neck brace. By November 1997, his injury was beginning to heal.

== Writing and in-fighting ==
As the members lived across the UK, they stored their equipment at Davies' home in Scotland. Channelling boredom and ambition, Davies spent December 1997 coming up with 15 potential song ideas. He later visited Hunter at his residence in Leeds and showed him the song ideas. The pair, plus Booth, continued writing material in Leeds, coming up with "Destiny Calling", "Runaground", and "Strangers". Around Christmas, Kulas went home to Canada, accompanied by Davies, who set up a studio space at Kulas' house. Booth had spent Christmas relaxing his neck; during this, he considered their label's idea of a greatest hits compilation.

Tension rose between Booth and bassist Glennie, which saw them not speaking to each other, and the other members being left out of the loop. Persuaded by manager Peter Rudge, James released The Best Of compilation in March 1998. It reached number one in the UK, pushing the Titanic soundtrack off the top spot in the process. The Best Of was promoted with new singles "Destiny Calling" (a month before release) and "Runaground" (a month after release). When the band learned the compilation had topped the chart, they went out to dinner with former member Larry Gott, and subsequently went to jam with Gott (working on the new song "Just Like Fred Astaire").

By this point, Davies had accumulated about 27 ideas that he had worked on with Hunter, with lyrical input from Booth. Davies took the ideas he had to London, where he showed the material to Brian Eno, who was positive about the songs. When promoting the compilation, Glennie opted out of some live performances. During one radio session for Greater London Radio, Glennie walked out, followed by drummer David Baynton-Power, who was tired of all the in-fighting. In April 1998, the band went on a tour of the UK, which was preceded by rehearsals and newly written material at Real World Studios. Rudge, concerned with Glennie's health, sent him a letter where he suggested to take some time off. Glennie misinterpreted this as the band trying to fire him. The members met up in London, with Rudge mediating the encounter, where they worked their issues out.

== Production ==
=== Sessions with Eno ===
In May 1998, the band (minus Booth) spent a week recording at Ridge Farm Studios in Capel, Surrey, with engineer Ott. Up to this point, the members would record home demos of tracks and would later show the rest of the band. One of these demos, "I Know What I'm Here For", was worked on at Ridge Farm with the aim of turning it into a full-band recording. Though they had set out to work on several songs, they ultimately only worked on "I Know What I'm Here For". It was recorded live in the studio, resulting in bleed between the instruments. Following this, Booth acted in a stage play throughout May and June, and the band appeared at the Guinness Fleadh and Glastonbury festivals later in June. In July, the band had begun work with Eno at Hook End Manor in Berkshire, which had its own studio for three weeks. He speeded up the vocal track on "I Know What I'm Here For" by 12% as he considered it to be too slow compared to the rest of the song.

Kulas said working with Eno made him aware of Eno's "strengths. He's also very modest so he doesn't force you to take on his ideas due to his ego." Glennie said Kulas was "perfect" for Eno's working method, while it "didn’t get the best out" of Oxaal, resulting in little contribution on the album from Glennie and Oxaal. The band worked with Eno again for another three weeks in September. He and Booth recorded vocals at Townhouse Studios in London during one week in November. Eno worked with the band for eight weeks in total, though the band's manager said it was only half-completed by this point. Glennie wasn't fond of having Eno to begin with: "Eno comes in and farts about for an afternoon, sprinkles oofle-dust and disappears for a couple of days." A few tracks were left unrecorded simply due to Eno disliking them.

=== Further recording and mixing ===
In December 1998, the band embarked on a UK arena tour, which saw them play seven tracks that would feature on their next album. Working with Steve Osborne, the band re-recorded "Just Like Fred Astaire", and recorded "Afro Lover" with Faithless. Further recording was held at Metropolis Studios in London in February 1999, where Booth and an engineer were working on "Confusion". Partway through the session, Eno walks in and aids them. Most of the final recordings were had the producer credited split between Eno, Davies and Hunter, with the exception of: "Just Like Fred Astaire" was produced by Eno and Osborne; "Shooting My Mouth Off" and "Vervaceous" were co-produced with Baynton-Power; and "Afro Lover" was produced by Faithless. Due to Booth succumbing to a throat problem, he had to re-sing all his vocal parts near the end of the sessions.

Alex Haas acted as the main engineer throughout the sessions, while also working with other engineers: Ott on "I Know What I'm Here For" and "I Know What I'm Here For"; Martin Wilding on "Vervaceous"; Davies and Hunter on "Hello" and "Someone's Got It in for Me"; and Benedict Fenner and Davies on "We're Going to Miss You". Ott engineered "Just Like Fred Astaire" with Theo Millar, and "Dumb Jam" with Andrew Page. Davies and Hunter engineered "Strangers". Eno mixed "Hello" and "Vervaceous", while Dave Bascombe mixed the remaining tracks with Davies and Hunter in attendance. The mixing sessions occurred in April 1999, after a two-month delay, and were split between Metropolis and another two London studios, Eden and Olympic. During this process three-to-four master tapes had disappeared, and the final arrangements of two tracks were unaccounted for. Fenner spent time at Metropolis reassembling the arrangement of "We're Going to Miss You". Similarly, Baynton-Power was looking through his computer's hard disk drive for any forgotten percussion takes.

== Composition and lyrics ==
Musically, Millionaires has been described as indie rock and pop, with elements of pomp rock, ambient and ethereal music, and drew comparison to Magic and Loss (1992) by Lou Reed and New Radicals. Davies took over as the main songwriter for the album from Baynton-Power and bassist Jim Glennie, both of whom had spearheaded Whiplash. Davies, Booth and Hunter wrote half over the material on the final album. Kulas said that Baynton-Power, who had an interest in dance music, brought a newfound perspective to Millionaires. Baynton-Power added that The Best Of compilation "focused what we were about. I realised James isn't about being weird or breaking new ground." A few tracks on the release grew out of jam sessions, which was the typical way the band wrote material. Booth said the album's title was in reference to people who thought the band members were rich, which was untrue. As Booth was ill during the making of the album, it made writing lyrics more difficult than usual. He highlighted "Crash" as a track that he felt was incomplete lyrically. The album featured a few love songs and some talking about revenge; discussing the latter, Booth said they refer to a "number of people in the last few years who would wish us harm."

"Crash" was compared to a combination of "Come Home" and the Laid (1993) outtake "The Lake". Its chorus consists solely of the title phrase. During one jam session, Booth began singing "when I hold her in my arms, I feel like Fred Astaire", which eventually evolved into "Just Like Fred Astaire". The track was initially titled simply "Fred Astaire", until the band was threatened with legal action from Fred Astaire's estate. The track is a ballad that details the giddiness that comes with a new love interest. "I Know What I'm Here For" features a happy hardcore keyboard part, and incorporates the use of a vocoder. The track's title comes from a 1952 speech by politician Aneurin Bevan. When the song was written, Booth considered leaving the band, which resulted in the lyric "hanging on through late December". The lyric "are you disciplined enough to be free" was adapted from a quote that Booth's friend would say in regards New Age devotees that thought freedom was achievable, not earned. "Shooting My Mouth Off" was compared to the likes of R.E.M. and U2, and was initially titled "Real World Jam". "We're Going to Miss You" is a techno–gospel song that Booth had written as a "charm of protection, because there have been a few people wishing us harm over the years." The song's brooding atmosphere was the result of Oxaal adding 36 cello parts; it was compared to Midnight Oil and Depeche Mode.

The country ballad "Strangers" opens with a guitar riff that was reminiscent of the one heard in Bob Dylan's "Knockin' on Heaven's Door" (1973). It was written about a person who felt they were born in the wrong life. "Hello" has a minimilist arrangement (vocals, brush snare and a piano) features improvised lyrics, and was compared to Original Soundtracks 1 (1995) by Passengers. "Afro Lover" is an anti-war track about the psychology behind weapon escalation, with a contrasting up-tempo arrangement in the vein of Neu! and David Byrne. Booth wrote "Surprise" about a friend of his that he assumed was on the edge of suicide. It used sotto voce in a manner that recalled "Time" by Pink Floyd. "Dumb Jam" earned its title as the band came up with the track during rehearsals for Woodstock '94 in New York City years prior. "Someone's Got It in for Me" is a parody about grunge musicians, and concludes with a orchestral crescendo that recalled the work of Phil Spector. The closing track "Vervaceous" features additional vocals from Sinéad O'Connor; the song grew out of a jam session from late 1997. Baynton-Power constructed it from 30 minutes' worth of fragments on an Apple Macintosh computer.

== Release ==
On 19 July 1999, "I Know What I'm Here For" was released as a single. Two versions were released on CD: one with "All Good Boys" and "Imagine Ourselves", and the other with "Downstairs" and "Stolen Horse". Its music video received heavy airplay on MTV in the US. To promote the single, the band played a one-off gig in Blackpool four days later. On 27 August 1999, Millionaires was announced for release in two months'. After being delayed from its 27 September date, "Just Like Fred Astaire" was eventually released as a single on 4 October 1999. Two versions were released on CD: one with "I Defeat" and "Long to See", and the other with "Mary", "Goal Goal Goal" and the music video for "Just Like Fred Astaire". The band attempted to acquire footage of Astaire for the clip, until they were denied by his estate. Launch nights and listening parties for the album were held on 4–8 October, across record stores and universities. Millionaires was released in the UK through Mercury Records on 11 October 1999.

Millionaires had been delayed from earlier in the year as not to clash with the promotion of another act of Mercury's, Texas. Due to the commercial failure of Whiplash, Millionaires didn't receive a US release. A limited two-CD version was also released, consisting of live material from festivals, alongside the music videos for "I Know What I'm Here For" (directed by David Mould) and "Just Like Fred Astaire" (directed by John Hillcoat). To coincide with the album's release, the band played a small show in London on the same day. The following day, they filmed a version of "Just Like Fred Astaire" for Top of the Pops. An appearance on Later... with Jools Holland aired on 16 October 1999 and featured several songs performed live. The band played a show in Portugal and held a signing session to coincide with the album's worldwide release two days later.

Booth, Davies and Kulas spent some time in Germany in mid-October 1999 doing radio/TV press interviews and acoustic performances. The band played two shows in Ireland at the end of November, leading up to a UK arena tour the following month. On 1 December, the band performed on the Jo Whiley show for BBC Radio 1. After initially being scheduled for release on 6 December, "We're Going to Miss You" was released as a single on 13 December 1999. The band re-entered the studio to remix the song for its single release. Two versions were released: one with "Wisdom of the Throat" and a live version of "Top of the World", and the other with "Pocketful of Lemons" and an Eno version of "We're Going to Miss You". The music video features Booth getting hypnotised, and was directed by John Hardwick. On 8 May 2000, the band played a show in London as part of MTV's Five Night Stand broadcast. Following this, the band played a one-off show in China for the Heineken Beat 2000 Summer Music Festival.

"I Know What I'm Here For" was included on the band's third compilation album The Collection (2004). "I Know What I'm Here For", "Just Like Fred Astaire", and "We're Going to Miss You" were included on the band's fourth compilation album Fresh as a Daisy – The Singles (2007). The music videos for those three tracks were included in the career-spanning box set The Gathering Sound (2012). Millionaires was pressed on vinyl for the first time in 2017.

== Reception ==
Professional ratings
Review scores
Source	Rating
AllMusic	4/5 stars
Bc magazine	4/5 stars
The Guardian	5/5 stars
NME	4/10
Q	4/5 stars
Uncut	4/5 stars

Millionaires received generally positive reviews from music critics. The Guardian writer Dave Simpson said the band made "an album that bids for the heavyweight crown of British rock", though it wasn't a "'Thank you, now we're rich, sod off' gesture, but an adventure laced with matters transcendental." Neil Chase of Bc magazine claimed it as their best record since their fifth studio album Laid (1993), and noted that Booth's vocals "have not only stood the test of time, but also seem to have improved with age." In the review for Q, Stuart Maconie stated that while the album's music was different by the likes of contemporaries Blur, Oasis and Radiohead, Millionaires shared with them "a similar burning sense of an idea whose time has come." He added that "if there’s any justice, Millionaires will be cited alongside when the great British rock records of this decade are counted." AllMusic reviewer Dean Carlson noted that it had "[c]risp, shiny, accessible pop songs" that "seem designed to go for Top 40 gold." He summarised the release as "two disparate halves: the former, an ecstatic stab of triumph and love, the latter, a mired, confused slab of dulling mediocrity."

Writing for Uncut, Nigel Williamson wrote that the record represented "forward momentum regained, in part due to the edgy tension between the rest of the band and the idiosyncratic Booth." It was a "strange, unpredictable and at times perplexing" album, which is why "it might just be the best album James have ever made." Independent on Sunday said it had "big ambitions, a bigger heart and choruses that are bigger still." Exclaim! writer Rob Bolton said Eno's production added "a richness and deep emotional feel to the already clever and catchy songs." Time Out's Peter Paphides found it meeting "all the criteria a reasonable man could lay down for a great album." Melody Maker writer Daniel Booth criticised the "emaciated torchsongs" for ruining the album. He closed his review asking a question: "Is this album a) Complete arse, b) Not that bad really, c) Pretty good, or d) F***ing fantastic? Trust me, you won't need to phone a friend." Soibahn Grogan of NME said it was "an entirely adequate, depressingly typical example" of the band's trademark: "the ordinary, the bland, the - yawn - reliability of each album."

Millionaires reached number two on the UK Albums Chart, being held off from the top spot by Shania Twain's Come On Over (1997). The album was certified gold by the British Phonographic Industry (BPI). "I Know What I'm Here For" peaked at number 22 on the UK Singles Chart. "Just Like Fred Astaire" reached number 17, and "We're Going to Miss You" peaked at number 48. Q included Millionaires on their list of the best albums of the year. Clash included "We're Going to Miss You" on their list of the top 10 best James songs.

== Track listing ==
All tracks written by James.

No.	Title	Producer	Length
1.	"Crash"	Brian Eno; Saul Davies; Mark Hunter	4:01
2.	"Just Like Fred Astaire"	Eno; Steve Osborne	3:47
3.	"I Know What I'm Here For"	Eno; Davies; Hunter	3:52
4.	"Shooting My Mouth Off" (not on all versions)	Eno; Davies; Hunter; David Baynton-Power (co.)	3:29
5.	"We're Going to Miss You"	Eno; Davies; Hunter	4:38
6.	"Strangers"	Eno; Davies; Hunter	5:16
7.	"Hello"	Eno; Davies; Hunter	4:38
8.	"Afro Lover"	Faithless	4:02
9.	"Surprise"	Eno; Davies; Hunter	5:08
10.	"Dumb Jam"	Eno; Davies; Hunter	2:38
11.	"Someone's Got It in for Me"	Eno; Davies; Hunter	4:11
12.	"Vervaceous"	Eno; Davies; Hunter; Baynton-Power (co.)	5:46
Total length:			51:26

== Personnel ==
Personnel per booklet, except where noted.

James

- Tim Booth – lead vocals
- Jim Glennie – bass guitars
- Adrian Oxaal – guitar, cello
- Michael Kulas – guitar
- Saul Davies – guitar, violin
- Mark Hunter – keyboards
- David Baynton-Power – drums

Production

- Brian Eno – producer, mixing (tracks 7 and 12)
- Saul Davies – producer (all except track 2), engineer (tracks 5–7 and 11)
- Mark Hunter – producer (all except track 2), engineer (tracks 6, 7 and 11)
- Steve Osborne – producer (track 2)
- Faithless – producer (track 8)
- David Baynton-Power – co-producer (tracks 4 and 12)
- Alex Haas – engineer (all except tracks 2, 6 and 10)
- Ott – engineer (tracks 2–4 and 10)
- Theo Millar – engineer (track 2)
- Andrew Page – engineer (track 10)
- Martin Wilding – engineer (track 12)
- Benedict Fenner – engineer (track 5)
- Dave Bascombe – mixing (all except tracks 7 and 12)
- Kevin Westenberg – band photography
- Steve Grubman – pig photography
- Jeni Nott – inside photography
- Subliminal – art direction, design

== Charts and certifications ==
=== Weekly charts ===
Chart performance for Millionaires
Chart (1999)	Peak position
UK Albums (OCC)	2

=== Certifications ===
Certifications for Millionaires
Region	Certification	Certified units/sales
United Kingdom (BPI)	Gold	100,000^{^}
^{^} Shipments figures based on certification alone.
