= Team Galaxy =

Team Galaxy may refer to:

- Team Galactic, the main antagonists of Pokémon Diamond and Pearl
- Team Galaxy (TV series), a 2006-2008 French-Canadian-Italian animated series
