= Adrian Oxaal =

- Born: 20 March 1965 (age 61); California, United States
- Genres: Alternative rock, experimental rock, pop
- Occupation: Musician
- Instruments: Guitar, cello, bass, keyboards
- Years active: 1990–present

Adrian Oxaal (born 20 March 1965) is an American-born English musician and music educator, best known for being the lead guitarist in James from 1997–2002 and 2015–present. He has also played with the bands Sharkboy, Oysterband and Goat.

== Biography ==
=== Early years, and work with Goat ===
Adrian Oxaal was born in California, United States, of mixed Norwegian-American and Guyanese ancestry, however, he grew up in Kingston upon Hull where he learned guitar and cello and befriended his future James colleague Saul Davies when both were members of the City of Hull Youth Symphony Orchestra. Oxaal went on to study music at the University of Sussex in Brighton, where he settled permanently.

Oxaal's heart was not in the world of classical music, and after leaving university he chose to play in bar bands, notably Lenna and the Snakemen, with whom he made 2 albums (Something's Cooking (1988) and No Blow Blues (1989)) – which eventually led to him being asked to play on a demo for a band named Goat (not the Swedish band of the same name) whose music Oxaal would later describe as being "a kind of melodic hard rock." Goat went to sign a deal with Beggars Banquet, although he admitted that it did not really amount to much apart from some studio experience.

=== Sharkboy ===
Oxaal was then recruited by singer-songwriter Avy to her band Sharkboy, in which he predominantly played guitar and cello. Somewhat different to – and more experimental than – the usual Britpop acts of the time, Sharkboy were nonetheless signed to Nude and went on to support Suede (whose frontman Brett Anderson was a fan) on their first big UK tour. Sharkboy recorded two albums (Matinee and The Valentine Tapes) which were critically well received but sold poorly, and the band folded circa 1995.

=== James ===
At around the same time the band James were having personnel problems, as lead guitarist Larry Gott had announced his departure. Oxaal's friend Saul Davies had been in James since 1989 (playing rhythm guitar, violin and percussion) and suggested Oxaal as a possible replacement for Gott. Oxaal was given an introduction to James that he regards as "bizarre", in which he was only given a drum loop and a vocal track and was asked to just "do something". The remaining members of James were impressed with his guitar skills and gave him the job immediately, relieved that they did not have to go through the long audition process which they had already experienced with the search for previous members.

Oxaal formally joined James in 1996 and remained as lead guitarist until the band went on hiatus in early 2002. During this time he played on three studio albums (Whiplash, Millionaires and Pleased To Meet You, as well as the live album/DVD Getting Away With It... Live. When James reformed in January 2007, Larry Gott resumed his position as lead guitarist and the band resumed their early 1990s Gold Mother line-up, which includes neither Oxaal nor the subsequent James member Michael Kulas.

In 2015, Oxaal was recalled to play lead guitar again, while Gott took an extended sabbatical. He also played mandolin and cello on the album Girl at the End of the World (2016).

James fans still debate about whether Oxaal or Gott was best suited to be James' lead guitarist, as many preferred Gott's simpler playing style and use of slide. However, drummer Dave Baynton-Power described Oxaal in 1997 as being "a really good guitar player....a bit more rocking than Larry, he's got a bit of an edge, which has injected a new spark into the band". This became evident on both the Whiplash and Millionaires albums, as well as in the live environment in which Oxaal was noted for his willingness to play "storming" guitar solos from time to time (something never really attempted by either Gott or his own predecessor in James, Paul Gilbertson).

=== Post-James (work in music education) ===
Following his time in James, Oxaal returned to Brighton and performed a handful of solo bar gigs, seemingly having gone full circle since leaving University. He then moved into music education, having worked as Course Team Leader for the BTEC National Diploma in Contemporary Music at South East Essex College of Arts and Technology in Southend-on-Sea, Essex. He left this post during the summer of 2007, and worked as a music teacher at Bexhill College, East Sussex, followed by a stint at City College, Brighton.

When not touring with James or Oysterband, Oxaal performs solo, either singing to blues guitar, or singing to cello accompaniment, and participates in occasional reunions of Lenna and the Snakemen, which included the recording of a third album (Back And Blue) in 2016. He also plays with Lucky Jim, a pub band comprising Gordon Grahame of The Lost Soul Band on vocals and guitar and Eddie Myer of Turin Brakes on bass. He has also appeared in many stage productions including: Motherland by Vincent Dance Theatre (2013), The Opinion Makers by Brian Mitchell and Joseph Nixon (2013) and Trumpton Comes Alive!, also with the Foundry Group (2015).

=== Oysterband ===
Since 2012, Oxaal has toured the UK, Germany, Austria, Canada and Scandinavia with folk rock band Oysterband, mainly playing cello, but also taking over on bass guitar and electric guitar. He played on their 2014 album Diamonds on the Water.

== Discography ==
=== Lenna and the Snakemen ===
- Something's Cooking (Wizard Records, 1988)
- No Blow Blues (Wizard Records, 1989)
- Back And Blue (crowdfunded, self-produced, 2016)

=== Goat ===
- As You Like (Beggars Banquet, 1990) BBL 110CD
- Medication Time (Beggars Banquet, 1991) BEGA 119CD

=== Sharkboy ===
- Matinee (Nude Records,1994) NUDE 2CD
- The Valentine Tapes (Nude Records, 1995) NUDE 4CD

=== James ===
- Whiplash (1997)
- Millionaires (1999)
- Pleased to Meet You (2001)
- Getting Away With It... Live (2002)
- Girl at the End of the World (2016)
- Living in Extraordinary Times (2018)
- All the Colours of you (2021)

=== Oysterband ===
- Diamonds on the Water (2014)
