= Whiplash (album) =

Studio album by James
- Released: 24 February 1997
- Recorded: 1995–1996
- Studio: Westside, London; The Windings, Wales; Cafe Mullet; Real World, Box, Wiltshire; RAK, London; Foel, Wales
- Genre: Electronic; folk rock
- Length: 43:15
- Label: Fontana
- Producer: Stephen Hague; Brian Eno; David Baynton-Power

James chronology
Wah Wah (1994)	Whiplash (1997)	The Best Of (1998)

Singles from Whiplash
- 1. "She's a Star" Released: 4 February 1997; 2. "Tomorrow" Released: 21 April 1997; 3. "Waltzing Along" Released: 23 June 1997

Whiplash is the seventh studio album by English rock band James. It was released on 24 February 1997, through Fontana Records. Following the release of the band's experimental sixth studio album Wah Wah (1994), they began working on a follow-up in 1995 at drummer David Baynton-Power's home studio. Over the course of 1995 and 1996, James recorded at several studios – Westside, The Windings, Cafe Mullet, Real World, RAK, and Foel – with producers Stephen Hague, Brian Eno, and Baynton-Power. Described as electronic and folk rock release, the album mixed in elements of the band's previous two studio albums.

Preceded by the release of Whiplash's lead single "She's a Star" in February 1997, James went on a United Kingdom tour the following month. The second single "Tomorrow" was released in April 1997; that same month, the band embarked on a tour of the United States. Shortly into the tour, frontman Tim Booth strained his neck, and later discovered that he had ruptured his C6 and C7 discs, causing the tour to be cancelled. The third single "Waltzing Along" was released in June 1997, coinciding with a stint on Lollapalooza until August of that year, when they appeared at the Reading Festival.

Whiplash received generally positive reviews from music critics, some of whom noted James' attempt to mix their older sound with newer elements. It peaked at number 9 in the UK, while its singles all reached the UK top 30, the highest being "She's a Star" at number 9. Whiplash was later certified gold in the UK, and "She's a Star" was certified silver in the same territory.

== Background ==
In 1993, James worked with producer Brian Eno, and released their fifth studio album Laid. Despite being relatively unsuccessful in the band's native United Kingdom, the album was a success in the United States due to the title-track "Laid" becoming a crossover hit. The band began working on material for their next album in August 1994, around an appearance at Woodstock '94. Up to this point, the band had spent the preceding three years touring the US consistently. They set up in a barn close to Woodstock, New York, and played improvised songs.

Wah Wah, an album of experimental music born out of the Laid recording sessions, was released in late 1994. On 16 November 1994, the band met up at The Windings in Wales to start writing for their next album. The day would later be known as James' 'Black Thursday': guitarist Larry Gott expressed interest in leaving the band to design furniture; frontman Tim Booth revealed his plans to record an album with composer Angelo Badalamenti; and the band learned that they owed several years' worth of back taxes, totalling £250,000. Shortly afterwards, Martine McDonagh, who was the mother of Booth's son, ceased to be the band's manager.

== Production ==
In early 1995, James recorded with Eno at Westside studio in London and The Windings for a period of two weeks. Following this, Gott officially left the band, with Booth stating that Gott "hated the whole fame thing even more than the rest of us." Booth spent most of 1995 in New York City recording the Booth and the Bad Angel album with Badalamenti. Due to the mounting pressure of the debt, Gott's departure, Booth being occupied, and the rest of the members living across the country, Baynton-Power took charge of their new album. He told bassist Jim Glennie to set up a recording studio at his house, dubbed Cafe Mullet. Baynton-Power purchased two TASCAM recorders, a mixing desk, monitors, and other recording equipment. Marking a change from their previous writing sessions, every member of the band contributed to the process, instead of being led by Booth. Out of the initial jam sessions, the band took vocal and melody samples, and reworked the songs around them.

Violinist-guitarist Saul Davies referred to Cafe Mullet as "an environment where people could try new ideas and write songs", which resulted in three-to-four songs from "a weird mishmash of live playing and technology". Progress on material was slow overall, and continued through to the end of 1995. Lacking the confidence to continue, the band invited Eno to help them. Glennie said Eno "didn't want to babysit us", and said he would join them occasionally to make sure things were progressing. While this was occurring, Booth and Badalamenti had moved recording from New York City to Liverpool and London. Phonogram, the owner of James' label Fontana Records, was growing concerned with the album and the lack of a big-name producer. With the creation of "Avalanche" and "Play Dead", the band, with Booth in tow, recorded with Stephen Hague in January and February 1996 at Real World Studios in Box, Wiltshire, and concluded at RAK Studios in London. Coinciding with this was the introduction of guitarist-celloist Adrian Oxaal of Sharkboy. He had known Davies when the pair played in a youth orchestra when they were both 16. Oxaal had previously seen James live in 1984, and was invited to join over the phone by Davies. Oxaal did some minor overdubs at Foel Studios in Wales.

Booth said Eno was "very much into immediacy, into seeing what he can disrupt", while Hague was "just the opposite, which made for a fascinating mix". At RAK, they rented two rooms to work in: the first room where Hague and the band recorded and editing songs; the now-mobile Cafe Mullet was set up in the other, which allowed Baynton-Power to decompile the tracks and experiment with them, with one-to-two other members. Eno appeared once a week in an overseer role, and is credited in the album booklet as "occasional co-production and frequent interference". Richard Norris served as the main engineer throughout recording, with additional engineering from Steve Williams, Baynton-Power, keyboardist Mark Hunter, Sam Hardaker, and James Brown. At the various studios, the band was assisted by Graeme Robinson and Alex Seel at RAK, Jaqui Turner at Real World, and Dave Green at Westside. The final recordings were produced by Hague, with co-production from Eno, and Baynton-Power acting as associate producer. The songs were mixed at RAK by Hague and Mike Drake, before being mastered by Ian Cooper at Metropolis Mastering.

== Composition ==
Musically, the sound of Whiplash has been described as electronic, and folk rock, with an approach that mixes the styles of Laid and Wah Wah. The album also contains elements of trip hop, and several songs are in a drum and bass style, while Booth's breathy vocals have been compared to those of Bono. The stylistic change was attributed to Gott's departure, Booth's work with Badalamenti, and the band's new writing methods. Glennie theorized it was due to the members' changing music interests, and discovering dance music. All of the songs are credited to the band, except for "Tomorrow", which also credits Eno. Eno and Hague both contributed keyboards and backing vocals to the recordings, while Andy Duncan provided percussion. Davies came up with the string arrangements on "Tomorrow" and "Play Dead"; Audrey Riley acted as the string leader for the former.

"Tomorrow" channels the up-tempo drumming pattern as heard in "Laid", and its overall guitar riffs and uplifting lyrics drew comparison to the U2 songs "Where the Streets Have No Name" and "With or Without You" (1987). An earlier version of the song appeared on Wah Wah, whereas this version featured a string arrangement courtesy of Davies. The subsequent track "Lost a Friend" continues in the same style as "Tomorrow", and details a person falling asleep while watching a television, whose their dreams become part of the entertainment. It was partially influenced by violence in the 1995 films Seven and Heat. The country-like "Waltzing Along" is a darker song in the vein of Laid track "Knuckle Too Far", and utilizes a three-beat waltz in the timing of 4/4.

"She's a Star" sees Booth singing in falsetto, while being accompanied by a piano, slide guitar, and Beatlesque vocal harmonies. Its title comes from Booth's ex-girlfriend whose middle-name was Zurina, which Booth claimed meant star in Indian. The song discusses a woman "coming into her own power, a stellar view of life with a different energy to the male world," and drew comparison to latter-day Suede. "Greenpeace" is a jungle track concerning environmentalism; initially written as a folk song, the final version is a movement in three parts: the first features a music box, affected by echo, and Booth discussing the unconcerned public; the second incorporates bells while Booth sings about big businesses; and the third sees Booth singing in a falsetto about the Earth. A sample of Eno screaming is used over the course of the song, while the creaking noise heard in the track was achieved by rubbing a marble cutting board against a brick wall.

"Go to the Bank" discusses the use of consumerism as a method to cope with heartbreak and depression. It opens with a violin part, before shifting into drum and bass. The song's lyrics were improvised by Booth in a single take, and sung through a boss compressor. The atmospheric rock song "Play Dead" was originally titled "Whiplash". Booth called it an electronic ballad that he croons over, while Davies considered it to be an industrial version of the Walker Brothers. "Avalanche" began as a sample that the band worked on at Baynton-Power's house, and eventually turned into a full song, while the lyrics for "Homeboy" are taken mostly from "Fishknives", a Laid outtake which the band had left unfinished at the time due to a lack of music to accompany it.

"Watering Hole", which initially began as "Angel", saw the band move into dub territory. The closing track, "Blue Pastures", is anchored around a bassline and a lone guitar part, with drums appearing briefly. The song was first worked on during the Laid sessions, with some improved lyrics. The band worked on it again two years after those sessions to complete the track, adding more lyrics in the process. Booth wrote it about a man who commits suicide by intentionally laying in snow in the Lake District; before the album's release, the husband of a friend of Booth's had died in the exact same manner. The song was played at the man's funeral, which prompted his wife to inquire as to how Booth knew it would happen.

== Release ==
Booth learned that their label had only one more release spot empty in their schedule for the rest of the year. He was told that if the Booth and the Bad Angel album was released first, the James album would have to be delayed for five months, whereas if the latter was released first, Booth and the Bad Angel would not appear for a year and a half. Badalamenti said he would be unable to promote at an unknown date in the future, but was able to do it now. After informing Glennie of the situation, he told Booth to go ahead with the release of his album. Booth and the Bad Angel was eventually released in August 1996. In November 1996, Whiplash was announced for release early next year. In January 1997, the band played three club shows in London.

Whiplash was released on 24 February 1997, through Fontana Records. The artwork features model Rebekah Couper-Noules wearing a mask, which the band thought to be a "strong image." By the time of the album's release, label president Ed Eckstein, who liked James, had been replaced by Danny Goldberg, who had no interest in the band, which resulted in little future promotion for them in the US. Goldberg had been previously sacked from a film project with Badalamenti a few years prior, which Booth said resulted in the album's failure in the US.

James went on a short promotional tour in the US, in preparation of a big tour in a few months' time. For this, Michael Kulas joined the band; he had been in contact with Davis the year before, who offered him an audition for their tour. In March 1997, the band performed "She's a Star" on The Late Show with David Letterman, and began donating the royalties from "Greenpeace" to the organization of the same name. Alongside this, they embarked on a UK tour for the majority of the month, which marked the first time the band toured their home country in over four years.

In April 1997, the band embarked on a US tour that was scheduled to last six weeks. On 30 April, Booth strained his neck dancing onstage, and by 3 May, he was forced to be seated during one show. Within a few days, he was unable to sing at a radio station promotional event, and was taken to a medical clinic in San Francisco, where he was placed in traction for a week. It was revealed that Booth had ruptured the C6 and C7 discs in his neck. As a result of this, he was forced to wear a neck brace, and the remainder of the US tour was cancelled. He was made to rest for four-to-six weeks before he was able to perform again.

Due to the neck brace, the band had to cancel their appearances at T in the Park and V Festival. When the organisers of the touring festival Lollapalooza heard of the cancellations, they offered the band a place on that year's trek. James toured the US as part of Lollapalooza until August 1997, which was followed by a performance at the Reading Festival. The band were scheduled to appear at the Glastonbury Festival, but was forced to cancel due to their commitments with Lollapalooza.

"Tomorrow", "Waltzing Along", and "She's a Star" were included on the band's first and fourth compilation albums The Best Of (1998) and Fresh as a Daisy – The Singles (2007). "Lost a Friend" was included on the band's third compilation album The Collection (2004). Whiplash was reissued on CD in 2001, with four bonus tracks: live versions of "Lost a Friend", "Greenpeace", and "Homeboy", as well as a remix of "Waltzing Along". The album was re-pressed on vinyl in 2017. "Hedex", an outtake from the album's sessions, was included on the career-spanning box set The Gathering Sound (2012), alongside the music videos for "She's a Star", "Tomorrow", and "Waltzing Along".

=== Singles ===
"She's a Star" was released as the lead single from Whiplash in the UK on 4 February 1997. It was issued to modern rock radio stations in the US a couple of weeks prior, and to mainstream rock stations in early February 1997. Three versions were released on CD: the first with "Chunny Chops", "Fishknives", and "Van Gogh's Dog" as extra tracks; the second with remixes of "Come Home" (1989) and "She's a Star" as extra tracks; and the third with live versions of "Stutter" and "Johnny Yen" as extra tracks. The song's music video was directed by David Mould, and is centred around the concept of a movie star.

"Tomorrow" was released as the second single on 21 April 1997. It was issued to modern rock radio stations in the US that same week. Three versions were released on CD: the first with "Gone Too Far", "Honest Pleasure", and "All One to Me" as extra tracks; the second with live versions of "Lost a Friend", "Come Home", and "Greenpeace"; and the third with remixes of "Tomorrow". The song's music video was directed by Kevin Godley, and was shot with a fast moving camera that the members had to duck to avoid being hit. The filming was almost called off as the label was shocked that Booth had shaved his head a few days prior.

A re-recorded version of "Waltzing Along" was released as the third single on 23 June 1997. Three versions were released on CD: the first with "Your Story", "Where You Gonna Run?", and "Long to Be Right" as extra tracks; the second with live versions of "Homeboy", "How Was It for You", and "Greenpeace"; and the third with remixes of "Waltzing Along". The song's music video was directed by John Hardwick, and filmed in Guadix, Spain. The video sees a car being driven across the Midwestern United States by James, a model, and two Turkish brothers.

== Reception ==
Professional ratings
Review scores
Source	Rating
AllMusic	3/5 stars
Calgary Sun	3.5/5 stars
Entertainment Weekly	B+
The Great Rock Discography	6/10
NME	4/10
Pitchfork	4.6/10
Q	4/5 stars
Sunday Mirror	8/10

Whiplash was met with generally favourable reviews from music critics. The staff at the Sunday Mirror found the album to be filled with "big tunes with rousing choruses ... James do it better than most, and if you like their single 'She's a Star' there's loads here to keep you happy with a few dance tracks too." Entertainment Weekly writer Josef Woodward said that the album "veers from catchy delights ... to experimental detours ... before signing off with a dreamwordly lullaby ... Whiplash is alterna-pop as its finest." David Sheppard of Q wrote that the album "sees James bolting back to centrefield" after the previous experiments of Wah Wah and Booth's work with Badalamenti. Toronto Sun's Jane Stevenson noted that Booth "seems to know his way around a melody or two", and mentioned that Wah Wah and Badalamenti "seems to have an effect" on Whiplash. She added that "James appears to have emerged stronger. And I, for one, couldn't be more pleased." The staff at The Sunday Times wrote that the band "sound much less angst-ridden than they used to; Booth's declamatory vocal style is here propelled forward by frenetic drums and acoustic guitars that positively glisten in the mix."

Calgary Sun writer Dave Vetc found the majority of Whiplash to be "classic James -- that is, surging folk-rock with anthemic choruses", with "just enough detours to keep the proceedings interesting." AllMusic reviewer Becky Byrkit noted that Hague's previous experience at synthesizer music "keeps the Eno wave alive", adding that the album continues the "ambient Eno aesthetics" of past releases, "where even signature silences mark time in terms of sound." Melody Maker's Richard Smith saw the band "taking a step back while simultaneously hedging their bets - half experimentation and half of the old familiar." He said the album was "more satisfying when they go back to being old-school James," criticizing Eno's assistance during recording. Pitchfork contributor Ryan Schreiber called the album a "very hit- and- miss affair, mixing some truly abyssmal tracks in with some of the band's best work ever." While he singled out a few songs, "there's not much else of interest here." NME writer Paul Moody said that the album "finds James returning to earth with a pronounced whimper." He added that "James in 1997 sound almost exactly how they always did - neither lost in depression nor the discotheque but still peddling the same stadium-lite psychobabble they've always done."

Whiplash reached number 9 in the UK, and number 158 in the US. All three of the album's singles charted highly on the UK Singles Chart: "She's a Star" at number 9, "Tomorrow" at number 12, and "Waltzing Along" at number 23. The album was certified gold by the British Phonographic Industry (BPI), and "She's a Star" was certified silver. Whiplash was chosen as one of the 50 best albums of 1997 by Q. Clash included "Tomorrow" and "She's a Star" on their list of the top 10 best James songs, with writer Richard Bowes considering the latter on par with similar 1997 songs, "Paranoid Android" by Radiohead and "Bitter Sweet Symphony" by the Verve.

== Track listing ==
All tracks written by James, except "Tomorrow" by James and Brian Eno.

1. "Tomorrow" – 3:45
2. "Lost a Friend" – 3:40
3. "Waltzing Along" – 3:54
4. "She's a Star" – 3:39
5. "Greenpeace" – 4:49
6. "Go to the Bank" – 4:22
7. "Play Dead" – 4:45
8. "Avalanche" – 3:46
9. "Homeboy" – 2:38
10. "Watering Hole" – 3:45
11. "Blue Pastures" – 4:19

== Personnel ==
Personnel per booklet.

James

- Jim Glennie – bass
- Tim Booth – vocals
- Larry Gott – guitar
- David Baynton-Power – drums
- Saul Davies – violin, guitar, string arrangements (tracks 1 and 7)
- Mark Hunter – keyboard
- Adrian Oxaal – guitar, cello

Additional musicians

- Brian Eno – keyboards, backing vocals
- Stephen Hague – additional keyboards, backing vocals
- Audrey Riley – string leader (track 1)
- Andy Duncan – percussion

Production

- Stephen Hague – producer, mixing
- Brian Eno – co-producer
- David Baynton-Power – associate producer, additional engineer
- Mike Drake – mixing
- Richard Norris – engineer
- Steve Williams – additional engineer
- Mark Hunter – additional engineer
- Sam Hardaker – additional engineer
- James Brown – additional engineer
- Graeme Robinson – assistant
- Alex Seel – assistant
- Jaqui Turner – assistant
- Dave Green – assistant
- Ian Cooper – mastering

Design

- Blue Source – art direction
- Davies & Davies – photography
- Rebekah Couper-Noules – model
- Greg Wittrock – masks

== Charts and certifications ==
=== Weekly charts ===
Chart performance for Whiplash
Chart (1997)	Peak position
UK Albums (OCC)	9
US Billboard 200	158

=== Certifications ===
Certifications for Whiplash
Region	Certification	Certified units/sales
United Kingdom (BPI)	Gold	100,000^{^}
^{^} Shipments figures based on certification alone.
