= FACTOR =

Canadian music-oriented nonprofit organization

FACTOR (the Foundation to Assist Canadian Talent on Records) is a private non-profit organization "dedicated to providing assistance toward the growth and development of the Canadian music industry".

== History ==
FACTOR was founded in 1982 by radio broadcasters CHUM, Rogers Radio Broadcasting, Moffat Communications, along with the Canadian Independent Record Production Association and the Canadian Music Publishers Association. FACTOR has been administering public money since 1986, when it began to grow. From an inaugural budget of $200,000 they now distribute over $11.5 million annually.

In 2009, the organization was criticised when a letter written by Unfamiliar Records founder Greg Ipp was republished on the internet.

== Signees ==
Notable recording artists who have received FACTOR grants include:

- Alexisonfire
- Alvvays
- Jann Arden
- BadBadNotGood
- Bedouin Soundclash
- Blue Rodeo
- Canadian Brass
- BOY
- Jason Collett
- Comeback Kid
- Courage My Love
- The Dears
- Devin Townsend
- Diemonds
- Die Mannequin
- The Flatliners
- The Flowers of Hell
- Fucked Up
- Good Kid
- Grimes
- Hey Rosetta!
- The Johnstones
- July Talk
- K'naan
- Mark Sultan
- Metric
- Michael Kulas
- Moneen
- No Joy
- Northcote
- Our Lady Peace
- Propagandi
- Protest the Hero
- PUP
- Sam Roberts
- Sean Kelly
- Silverstein
- Spiritbox
- The Standstills
- Timber Timbre
- The Trews
- Wolf Parade
- Woodpigeon
- Xavier Rudd
- Yukon Blonde
- Zeds Dead
