= List of Team Galaxy episodes =

The following is a list of episodes from the television animated series, Team Galaxy. The season 1 premier was on 26 August 2006.

== Episodes ==
=== Season 1 (2006–07) ===
| No. | Title | Prod. code |
|---|---|---|
| 1 | "The New Recruit" | 101 |
in 2049 a.d. An ambitious new student shows up at Galaxy High and becomes popular. The student is like a rebel like Josh, an A-plus student like Brett and a multi-talented entertainer like Yoko. Everyone at school find the new student to be completely delightful. Yoko, on the other hand, is instantly suspicious of him. Her plan to expose him as a fraud backfires, causing the students and teachers to like him even more. Will Yoko be able to expose this new student for the 'fraud' that he is, or in the end is this really a big misunderstanding? Meanwhile, Yoko hosts the first ever Galaxy High Open Mic Talent.
| 2 | "Intergalactic Road Trip" | 102 |
While on a routine mission to patrol the outer regions of Earth's atmosphere, Josh gets an idea. Instead of doing another boring patrol, they decide to visit a galaxy. They quickly find out that there are aliens in the universe. Josh quickly gets into trouble – winning a bet to a tough alien who immediately wants to take him out. Meanwhile, Brett and Yoko are taken into custody by Pompadour, an agent of the Dark Force, Josh gets Yoko and Brett back and get back to Galaxy High before curfew. Guest Starring: Scott McNeil as Pompadour
| 3 | "Brett's Brain" | 103 |
When Galaxy High receive a distress call from a nearby friendly planet called Computopia, Josh, Yoko and Brett are sent to help robot aliens who live there. The computer that runs their weird planet has broken down and they need help fixing it. Only when they realize that Brett is even smarter than their aging mainframe, their intentions go from innocent to evil. Once Brett returns, the aliens follow and steal Brett's brain right out from inside his head.
| 4 | "Psycho-Cycle" | 104 |
Josh, Yoko and Brett are sent on a mission to investigate the strange disappearances of a number of friendly aliens. The alien abductor makes off with Josh and Fluffy before Yoko and Brett can stop him. Josh and Fluffy end up on a small, uncharted asteroid where everyone who was kidnapped is forced to square off against one another in a game called Psycho-Cycle. At first, Josh is trying to survive, but he is surprised when he unwittingly wins the game, and he (and Fluffy) become instant superstars to all of the fans. Meanwhile, Yoko and Brett are able to piece together clues which lead them to the next competition. When they arrive, the team is shocked to see that Josh and Fluffy are total celebrities in the sport.
| 5 | "Intergalactic Ahoy" | 105 |
In a prologue, Bobby's team is abducted in outer space by an unseen force. Meanwhile, back at Galaxy High, Principal Kirkpatrick reveals to Josh, Brett and Yoko that the missing team was investigating a series of space hijackings when they themselves seem to have been hijacked. After coming across the rival team's disassembled and abandoned Hornet, the gang pieces together clues that lead them to a ragtag crew of space pirates. When Josh's team tries to save Bobby's team (as well as other slave aliens), they too are captured by the pirates and put to work.
| 6 | "H2O-No" | 106 |
When Galaxy High receives distress signals from various planets in the universe, the Principal sends several teams out to investigate. When they arrive at their various destinations, they uncover that the planets are not only abandoned but completely dried out; what were once fertile, colorful worlds are now dusty and desolate. But before the teams can investigate further, Kirkpatrick informs them that yet another planet has sent out a distress call. Josh's team springs into action, heading toward the planet in their Hornet.
| 7 | "Emperor Brett" | 107 |
When a Galaxy High satellite picks up a distress signal, Josh's team is sent to check it out. Fed up with his team not chosen to the mission, Bobby follows Josh's team to prove he's the real leader. The team arrives on a seemingly uninhabited planet and quickly split up to search for the source of the signal. Though Josh and Yoko don't find anything significant, Brett comes across a race of weird, plant-like aliens. At first he's scared, but Brett is relieved as the creatures start to worship him as their master. As the aliens cater to Brett's every whim, the worshipping goes to his head.
| 8 | "Miss Cosmos" | 108 |
While on a mission, Josh, Yoko and Brett stop at a nearby intergalactic truck-stop to gas-up and find that the place is hosting "Miss Cosmos" beauty pageant, Josh decides to stay because he meets an alien girl. Despite Brett's protests, Josh goes to a date with the alien girl and Yoko signs up for the competition. Meanwhile, Brett discovers something strange and tries to explain that to Josh and Yoko, but fails. Yoko, Brett and the pageant contestants are captured. They then find out that the pageant is being run by an evil alien who is stealing the contestants' beauty and brains.
| 9 | "Yoko's Secret" | 109 |
When several Galaxy High teams are taken on a class field trip to an exotic planet, they are warned to only observe the environment and not to touch anything. Yoko spots a cute, tiny little alien creature and covertly confiscates it to take back and keep it as her pet. Back at Galaxy High, Yoko goes to extreme lengths to keep the pet a secret from the faculty and other students. But one night, after giving the cute creature a bath, it begins to multiply like mad, budding into hundreds of nasty identical aliens. As the school becomes overrun by these creatures, Yoko has no choice but to come clean and admit what she did.
| 10 | "Shipwrecked" | 110 |
When alien spacecraft start to inexplicably disappear in one corner of the galaxy, Josh, Yoko and Brett are sent on a mission to check it out. As their ship approaches that region of space, the Hornet is uncontrollably sucked toward a small planet where it crash lands. On the planet, the gang finds alien ships and pilots. The planet is getting sucked toward a black hole.
| 11 | "When Josh Attacks" | 111 |
When an important GH homework assignment comes due, Josh forgets to do his homework. A mound of extra homework, due first thing in the morning. As a distressed Josh heads to the library, the school comes under attack from alien invaders. Josh tries to warn everyone but no one (including Brett and Yoko) believes him as they think of it as Josh's prank which results all of GH students to be captured by the aliens.
| 12 | "Alien Brett" | 112 |
When Brett, Josh and Yoko are sent to capture an evil alien. Soon after, Principal Kirkpatrick informs Brett that, although his academic performance at Galaxy High is exemplary, his physical performance is not. He tells that if he doesn't improve, he's going to have to dismiss him from the space marshal program. Determined to improve his physicality at any cost, Brett decides to experiment on himself using the alien they captured earlier. He administers himself with traces of the creature's DNA, hoping it will boost his physical strength.
| 13 | "Conference-tation!" | 113 |
When numerous aliens throughout the galaxy mysteriously go missing days before an important Intergalactic Peace Conference, Principal Kirkpatrick sends two teams to check it out. After some investigation, the teams discover that a pattern is emerging each missing alien seems to possess a unique power: super strength; the ability to read minds; incredible agility; the power of invisibility, etc. Clues ultimately lead the marshals to a fiendish alien scientist who is using the aliens he has abducted to create a new super-alien that is virtually unstoppable.
| 14 | "Comet Surfing" | 114 |
The latest craze that's sweeping the Galaxy is comet surfing – a wild sport where teens use a high-tech "space board" to ride the tail wave of a comet! Josh, Bobby and Toby are all stoked to try the sport, but the activity is strictly prohibited by Principal Kirkpatrick. Regardless, that night, they pull out their boards and sneak off to the comet zone. As they hit the surf, Bobby and Josh each try to impress Toby. But ultimately, none of their efforts are very impressive as a massive uber-comet appears and swallows them whole! The next day when they aren't in class, Principal Kirkpatrick sends their remaining teammates on a mission to try to find them. Clues lead Yoko, Brett and Kimball to the mysterious uber-comet. It turns out that the comet is actually manmade. And it's being operated from the inside by the bitter alien pioneer of the comet surfing craze, Johnny Stardust. Because comet surfing has become so popular, all of the younger participants have gotten much better than the alien. So much so, that he has lost all of his intergalactic sponsors. Guest Starring Matt Hill as Johnny Stardust
| 15 | "Robot Reboot" | 115 |
Josh tries to upgrade Fluffy, he sneaks into Principal Kirkpatrick's office and hacks into the GH mainframe. After his upgrade, he's convinced that he's accomplished his goal: Fluffy is more intelligent and independent. Josh doesn't realize that he's also downloaded a harmful living computer virus, Rex-3. The result, Fluffy soon turns evil and plans to take over Galaxy High. He quickly upgrades all of the other ultrapets at GH to join in his cause.
| 16 | "Mega Moon Mints" | 116 |
When Yoko sees an ad in the back of "Space Marshal Quarterly" for "the business opportunity of a lifetime". She's been looking for a way to fund The Yoko Troupers (her new intergalactic theatre troupe) and selling "Mega Moon Mints". She quickly orders hundred boxes of the "deliciously addictive" peppermint edibles. The mints soon arrive—and they're immediately a huge hit. The next day when she wakes up and finds that her fellow GH students and teachers are missing. Yoko goes into investigation mode and figures out that the mints were manufactured on a nearby planet. Along with Josh, Brett, and Fluffy, she takes off to find out what happened. Our gang arrives on the planet to find the missing GH people as well as a handful of other mint-craving aliens and they also find the evil alien chef who is behind it all. He has engineered his Mega Moon Mints so that anyone who consumes them becomes a mindless mercenary dedicated to his cause of taking over the universe.
| 17 | "Dance Dance Elimination" | 117 |
When a famed, intergalactic virtual gaming arcade opens in their part of the galaxy, Brett, Josh and Yoko rush to check it out. When they arrive, Brett is quickly dazzled by a 3-D chess-like game; Josh is stoked on a way realistic flying game; and Yoko is entranced by a virtual dance competition. Brett and Josh are beaten by their highly skilled computerized opponents but, to everyone's shock, Yoko wins. With prize in hand, she heads back to Galaxy High. Her celebration is short-lived as the virtual dancer from the game, furious that she's been defeated, comes to life and goes after Yoko.
| 18 | "How Much Is That Human in the Window?" | 118 |
With the Galaxy High celebrating the Christmas holidays, Principal Kirkpatrick is angry because Josh played a prank with putting all of his pictures in one box. For punishment he sends Josh to patrol with Yoko and Brett. When Josh, Yoko and Brett take a wrong turn on a routine patrol and suddenly find themselves lost in unfamiliar space territory, they're quickly ambushed and captured by an IAC—an Intergalactic Alien Catcher.
| 19 | "Class of 2051" | 119 |
It's early morning and Josh, Yoko and Brett are on a routine patrol when they get a call from Principal Kirkpatrick until something extremely odd happens. Their Hornet is sucked into a vortex. Thinking it must've been a harmless cosmic tornado, the team continues on their way. The team realizes that the "tornado" they went through must've been some kind of space/time wormhole.
| 20 | "Mini Marshalls" | 120 |
When Brett discovers that all of the planets in the galaxy seem to have gone missing, his team is quickly sent to investigate the phenomenon. As the team searches for any sign of the missing cosmic bodies, they suddenly get a panicked distress call from Earth. When they return to Galaxy High, they witness an alien vessel is using a ray to shrink the planet. The gang springs into action, but before they can stop the culprit, the vessel scoops up the miniaturized planet and disappears. Ultimately, Josh, Yoko, Brett and Fluffy are able to track down the baddie on his home planet. Guest Starring: Terry Klassen as King Shortstuff
| 21 | "Brett Squared" | 121 |
Josh, Yoko and Brett are out on a routine patrol when suddenly, they find their Defenders caught between two black holes. They both get intense gravitational pull on their ships, Brett's Defender splits them apart. Incredibly, the gravitational pull has somehow separated the child part of Brett from the genius part of him. As the child Brett naively goes about his day, he suddenly finds himself under assault. He tells Josh and Yoko what happened, and that he suspects the genius Brett is to blame. They don't believe him. Ultimately, genius Brett captures child Brett and flies him away from GH.
| 22 | "Cosmic Crisis" | 122 |
When Josh's team is sent on a mission to investigate a series of explosive disturbances in outer space that are sending shockwaves throughout Galaxy High, the gang comes across a small planet with two warring sets of alien neighbors on it. Turns out that the explosions are actually coming from the alien inhabitants who have been fighting one another for several millennia. The students immediately intervene, trying to keep the peace, but in no time, Yoko, Brett, Josh and Fluffy are unwittingly being used as pawns in the feud. As the fighting escalates, no one realizes that the disturbances have actually started to pull the planet in half potentially creating a chain reaction that could destroy half the universe.
| 23 | "Recycle Rampage !" | 123 |
Josh, Yoko and Brett are sent to unload a bunch of outdated Galaxy High computer equipment at an intergalactic junkyard. But when they arrive, they discover that the guard who normally works there is missing. When they attempt to report their findings to Principal Kirkpatrick, they suddenly find themselves under attack and captured by a robot constructed out of electronic components.
| 24–26 | "Circus of the Stars (Part 01 - 03)" | 124-126 |
While out on patrol, Josh, Yoko and Brett meet a group of alien teenage space racers and are immediately drawn to them. Josh is seduced by the adrenaline rush; Brett's attracted to the vehicles' home-made technology and Yoko falls for the group's cute leader. Though they try to talk their way out of it, the menacing space racers won't back down. When Principal Kirkpatrick discovers what they've done, he hands down the strictest punishment of all, expelling them from Galaxy High. Brett accuses Josh for the situation. Even though they are technically expelled, they start a new mission. Josh, Brett and Yoko follow a trail of clues which leads them to a strange planet on the edge of the universe. Josh, Yoko and Brett are happy after they saved the students, but Principal Kirkpatrick again fires them from GH.

=== Season 2 (2007–08) ===
| No. | Title | Prod. code |
|---|---|---|
| 27 | "Marshal for a Week" | 201 |
When Galaxy High experiences a budget deficit, Principal Kirkpatrick comes up with a solution to get the funds necessary to keep the school up and running: offer a "Week At Galaxy High" to the highest bidder:Thurston Styles III. He got his big chance to become a space marshal (when he applied to Galaxy High, he didn't pass the psychological exam). He takes over the ship, forcing the team to go on an extremely dangerous mission.
| 28 | "Space-squatch" | 202 |
When the GH students study intergalactic alien legends in class, they learn about a very rare and very dangerous alien called Space-squatch. Josh, Yoko and Brett set out to track the mysterious creature and collect the reward/fame/guaranteed A+ that comes with his capture, they must do whatever it takes to save him. Easier said than done considering the vicious bounty hunter will stop at nothing to get his prize.
| 29 | "The Matchmaker" | 203 |
When Yoko realizes that Mr. Spzoercliipw' is a bachelor at age 249, she decides to play matchmaker. At first Mr. S. is skeptical, but Yoko eventually convinces him to give it a shot and finds an alien woman. Though everyone is shocked, they're all happy for Mr. S. and attend the alien wedding. After the couple leaves for their honeymoon, Yoko soon discovers the horrifying truth: the alien woman is actually a creature who, once married, eats their spouse. Yoko and the gang must save Mr. S. before it's too late.
| 30 | "Cybercop 4000" | 204 |
When Principal Kirkpatrick sends the team on a mission to stop an alien baddie from terrorizing a peaceful planet, Josh, Yoko and Brett spring into action. When they arrived, they noticed that someone has beaten them to it. The gang watches incredulously as Cybercop 4000 – an enormous crime-fighting robot with 4000 amazing functions easily takes out the bad guy. The gang quickly returns to GH to report the incident to PK, he tells his troops that they're going to have to be extra efficient on their missions. Despite the teams' vigilance, the crime-fighting cyborg continues to out-perform them. And, faced with no other choice, PK decides to close Galaxy High. In the end, Josh, Yoko and Brett discover that the robot's creator is not so benevolent after all.
| 31 | "Planet Goodtimes" | 205 |
When Galaxy High receives calls from various planets around the universe reporting a strange and sudden state of coldness and darkness, Principal Kirkpatrick sends Josh, Yoko and Brett out to investigate. They discover that these planets are actually missing their suns and go back to Earth. They see that an alien is going to steal the Sun, they try to stop it, they are not successful and Earth plunged in complete blackness. Josh, Yoko and Brett follow clues that eventually lead them to Planet Goodtimes -- an incredibly luxurious and tropical resort. As they sneak onto the planet, they come to discover that the alien, Pompadour, who created the resort has been stealing the suns in an effort to provide his guests with 24/7 solar satisfaction. Guest Starring: Scott McNeil as Ponpadour
| 32 | "Dragodor Madness" | 206 |
As Josh, Yoko and Brett return to Earth from a mission, they suddenly have Hornet problems and are forced to crash land on a small, uncharted planet. When they get out to assess the damage, they've landed in the middle of a strange coliseum. When the team asks what they're talking about, they explain that once a year a powerful alien comes to their coliseum and fights their toughest gladiators. When game day comes, Josh, Yoko and Brett are horrified to see how massive the real creature is.
| 33 | "Mr. 6025-A46" | 207 |
When Principal Kirkpatrick informs the students that Mr. Fitch has retired, they cheer. But when he explains that Galaxy High will be getting a new teacher to replace him. But their attitudes quickly change when they meet Mr. 6025-A46 – a dynamic, charismatic, fun-at-all-cost alien teacher! Mr. 6025-A46 soon becomes the most popular teacher on campus, winning the hearts and minds of all the students with the exception of Brett. Though Josh and Yoko try to convince him otherwise, Brett is certain there's something not quite right about this teacher. After doing some snooping, Brett confirms his suspicions that Mr. 6025-A46 is actually an evil alien who escaped from the Galaxy High containment facility.
| 34 | "The Toe Is the Foe" | 208 |
When aliens are reported missing all over the universe, Josh, Brett and Yoko are sent to check it out. Their investigation yields no clues and the case goes cold, forcing them to return to school. Meanwhile, Fluffy keeps dropping hints about his birthday. He gets captured by the Intergalactic Alien Catcher (from episode #018). At first, Fluffy thinks his new life is going to be glamorous. By the time Josh, Yoko and Brett realize Fluffy is missing and trace his trail to the IAC.
| 35 | "Adventures in Alien-sitting" | 209 |
Principal Kirkpatrick announces that he's holding a trial for a dangerous alien at Galaxy High. Josh, Brett and Yoko are all ears when Principal Kirkpatrick tells them that they have a very important role in the trial. Josh, Yoko and Brett try to run damage control as there is a swath of destruction across Galaxy High, releasing creatures from the GH containment facility. When Kirkpatrick reprimands the team for making noise, the gang tries to explain that it's all Fypon Jr's fault. He doesn't accept their apology but gives them a stern warning: no more goofing around or they'll be forced to clean the GH.
| 36 | "Yoko-mania!" | 210 |
When Yoko gets a singing gig at an intergalactic concert hall, she's totally psyched. Meanwhile, back at GH, the gang gets an urgent call from Principal Kirkpatrick, sending them on an emergency mission. When Josh and Brett realize that Yoko is missing, they set out to find her before tackling their assignment. When they arrive at the venue and approach Yoko, however, they immediately start to sense something strange about her.
| 37 | "Monkey Business" | 211 |
When prominent space researchers, travelers and technicians suddenly go missing around the galaxy, Josh, Yoko, Brett and Fluffy are put in charge of the investigation. As the gang visits a space station where the first alien disappeared from, it becomes quickly apparent that there was a struggle and the missing alien tech was abducted. Just then, Josh, Yoko, Brett and Fluffy receive word from Kirkpatrick that Roskoff, who is out on a patrol in space, has sent him a distress signal. After getting over the fact that Ms. Roskoff was part of such a strange experiment, the gang heroically steps in to battle Bobo and save the kidnapped researchers. In the end, Bobo is brought back to Galaxy High where they are able to reverse the effects of the radiation - turning him back into the monkey.
| 38 | "Star Maps" | 212 |
When Josh, Yoko, Brett and Fluffy spot the ship of a colorful star chart reader on the way back from a mission, Yoko begs them to make a pit stop. Principal Kirkpatrick calls and tells them he has an urgent mission for them: strange and dangerous phenomena have been popping up all over the galaxy. Bobby's team is investigating an uncharted pulsar while Spavid's team is looking into a mysterious aurora. They arrive at the planet in question and see the aliens desperately fleeing from it in their ships, they see a giant ice volcano (that did not exist on the tropical planet previously), spewing chunks of frozen water from its core.
| 39 | "Intergalactic Exchange" | 213 |
Mr. Spzoercliipw' has some exciting news for the students of his Alien Cultures class: he has arranged for three teams to visit three different alien schools on three different planets, each unique and interesting. Bobby, Toby and Kimball will go to sunny and tropical Lushtopia; Spavid, Andi and Ryan will visit the bustling Hiptropolous; and Josh, Brett and Yoko will be attending Outpost High on Dustbowl 11. At the end of their visits, the teams will return to Galaxy High and give reports on their experiences. When the gang arrives on Dustbowl 11, they are greeted by a group of cheery aliens and treated as guests of honor. As the week progresses, though, strange things begin to happen. Yoko is suddenly missing a chunk of her hair, Josh notices that his toenails have been mysteriously clipped and Brett loses a tooth. Suspecting that something is going on, the gang snoops around the school and ultimately discovers that, in a secret lab, the aliens are using their DNA samples to create replicants.
| 40 | "Super Spavid !" | 214 |
In Merthoz, the GH space marshals attend a very special ceremony – a ceremony where Spavid is recognized as an official Merthozian adult. Suddenly, Spavid can move objects with his mind; has the ability to become invisible; and discovers that he can fly! As a result of his newfound skills, he quickly becomes the most popular space marshal at Galaxy High. Merthoz comes under attack (from its arch nemesis planet Werthoz), and, with Spavid nowhere to be found, the other marshals head for the planet to try and help. The attacking aliens are too much for the marshals to handle alone. When Spavid finally gets word of the assault, he shows up to help – using his knowledge to defeat the intruders. In the end, Spavid decides to return his powers until he feels he's adult enough to handle them.
| 41 | "Treasure of the Solara Moonray" | 215 |
While on a Ms. Schragger-lead field trip to the far away planet of Solara Moonray, Josh, Yoko and Brett discover what appears to be some kind of mysterious artifact. The gang vows to keep the map a secret and set out together in the morning to find the treasure. After restraining the team, Blackbeards opens the treasure, only to find that he's released an evil alien that was imprisoned inside by the Solara Moonrayians. The map was a trick created by the alien to fool someone into releasing him.
| 42 | "The Belly of the Beast" | 216 |
When Josh, Yoko, Brett and Fluffy are sent on an assignment to find out what destroyed a cosmic fueling station and caused their GH friend Spavid to suddenly go missing, they quickly realize this is no ordinary mission. After landing on a large planet to do some investigating, they soon realize that the planet isn't a planet, it's actually a gigantic space creature which is capable of devouring everything in its path including them. Despite their best efforts to thwart it, the creature swallows them whole. Yoko makes a startling discovery: this particular alien creature actually has a funny bone. When the gang tickles it using a gadget, they're able to laugh their way out of the hungry beast.
| 43 | "Toy Galaxy" | 217 |
When Principal Kirkpatrick announces that he's sold the Team Galaxy toy rights to famed cosmic toy maker Marty McBoogle, the marshals are totally psyched. To celebrate the launch of the Team Galaxy line, PK authorizes a field trip to an intergalactic toy fair for the unveiling of the toys. When they're presented to the cosmic public, the toys go bad – attacking everything in sight with their mini gadgets before escaping! After some investigation, what the gang eventually discovers is that Rex-3 (from episode #015) is to blame. After slipping away from the GH Containment Facility and stowing aboard Marty McBoogle's ship, Rex-3 snuck his way into the inner workings of the toy maker's factory… causing a glitch which turned the Team Galaxy toys evil.
| 44 | "Cosmic High !" | 218 |
When Josh unexpectedly gets a big part on "Cosmic High," the hottest teen space TV show in the entire universe. Though Yoko, Brett and Fluffy are shocked and disappointed by their teammate's seemingly rash decision, they promise to tune in every week in a show of support. When Josh returns to the "Cos High" set to begin his new life, however, things quickly go from fun to strange. It seems that Vera isn't such a good actor after all -- she's actually extremely delusional and believes that her TV show is reality.
| 45 | "Strange Fruit" | 219 |
On the way back from a mission, Josh, Yoko and Brett check out the local cuisine. When they get there, they find that the planet doesn't have any restaurants. Upon returning to Galaxy High, Josh's skin starts to turn red; a stem emerges from the top of his head; seeds begin shooting out of his ears. Josh decides to head back to the planet where he became affected to desperately seek a remedy. He finds himself on the run from a herd of hungry aliens.
| 46 | "Cool Hands Marshals" | 220 |
When Josh, Brett and Fluffy are out helping Yoko practice for her upcoming pilot test, Yoko accidentally backs into a building while she's trying to parallel park the Hornet!
| 47 | "Trick or Treat" | 221 |
It's Halloween time at Galaxy High and Josh, Yoko, Brett and Fluffy decide to head to nearby planet Treat to do their intergalactic trick-or-treating! Though Brett's tired and wants to head back to GH, Josh and Yoko want to go to a party leaving Brett disappointed. His attitude quickly changes when he arrives at the totally fun gathering.
| 48 | "Shades of Gray... Matter" | 222 |
When Brett grows frustrated with his Galaxy High classmates for not taking their educational endeavors as seriously as he does, he begins to make new friends.
| 49 | "E-I-E-O-No !" | 223 |
When the gang is sent on a mission to check out strange attacks against an intergalactic amusement park designer, they discover clues that lead them, oddly enough, to one of the last remaining space farms in the galaxy. Upon arriving (undercover as farm hands) and meeting the kindly old alien farmer who owns the place. Turns out space farming is much more difficult than space marshaling. A giant egg has hidden in a secret part of the farm suddenly cracks open and they find themselves under assault from a giant, angry chick.
| 50–52 | "Predator Plants from Outer Space! (Part 01 - 03)" | 224-226 |
In the series finale's teaser, we see a cosmic storm thrash a small planet inhabited by alien plant life. At school, Omni is introduced to everyone, and, because of his likeable personality, fast becomes a hit (which makes Brett jealous). Suddenly, Principal Kirkpatrick alerts everyone to come outside. Only when they arrive on the plants' host planet, they make a startling discovery: remnants of a previous civilization, presumably ravaged by the same plant aliens. Meanwhile, back on Earth, the aliens have taken over every aspect of human life: they are driving automobiles, crowding our movie theatres, and running our governments. Back at school, the team explains that, after a close examination of Bravero, they've determined that he is an herbivore: he eats leaves then spits an acidic substance on them, turning the plant to an edible paste. The gang realizes what they need to do to defeat the plant aliens: mass produce the chemical created by the alien insect and deliver it to them. Since they can no longer mass produce the acidic substance in the GH lab, Josh wants to know what their next move is. Brett isn't sure, but suggests they take refuge in a greenhouse. Inside, he finds some weed repellent and attempts to use it on the plant aliens.They stand at the ready, not knowing what to expect. But they are thrilled when they see Omni step out of the cockpit. The gang uses the heat to cause their alien insect friend to multiply. After a fierce battle, the gang heroically defeats the villain by giving Bravero a dose of weed repellent causing him to grow to gigantic proportions. The earth is saved! In the end, Omni, after putting Gangus in the GH Containment Facility, prepares to leave.
