= Pleased to Meet You (James album) =

Studio album by James
- Released: 2 July 2001
- Recorded: Late 2000 – January 2001
- Studios: Ridge Farm, Capel, Surrey; Whitfield St., London; House in the Woods, Bletchingley
- Genre: Stadium rock
- Length: 48:05
- Label: Mercury
- Producers: Brian Eno; Saul Davies; KK; James

James chronology
Millionaires (1999)	Pleased to Meet You (2001)	Hey Ma (2008)

Singles from Pleased to Meet You
- 1. "Getting Away with It (All Messed Up)" Released: 25 June 2001

Pleased to Meet You is the ninth studio album by English rock band James, released on 2 July 2001. Less than a year after the release of Millionaires (1999), the band were playing new material live. Recording was split between Ridge Farm, Whitfield St., House in the Woods studios; producer credit was split between Brian Eno, guitarist/violinist Saul Davies, KK and the band. "Getting Away with It (All Messed Up)" was released as a single in late June, followed a week later by Pleased to Meet You on 2 July through Mercury Records.

The front cover features a composite image of all the band members' faces. Pleased to Meet You reached number 11 on the UK albums chart, and was certified silver by the BPI. Lead single "Getting Away with It (All Messed Up)" reached number 22 on the UK singles chart. The record received a mainly favourable response from music critics. It was promoted with an appearance on Top of the Pops and various festivals across three months in the UK, Spain and Portugal. Vocalist Tim Booth left the band after their December UK tour; the final show of which was released as the Getting Away with It...Live live/video album in early 2002.

== Background and production ==
James released their eighth album Millionaires in October 1999. In March 2000, the band revealed they had been writing new material and planned to record later in the year, with the aim of releasing an album in January 2001. During their performance at the V Festival in August, the band played three new songs. The following month, the band revealed they were in the process of recording with Brian Eno, doing pre-production. In October and November, the band embarked on a UK club tour. They used the stint to test how the new songs would sound live before they planned to record them. They had written over 30 tracks for inclusion on their next record; on the opening night, the band played seven of these new songs. Though the band had planned to use a different producer for the main sessions, Eno and guitarist/violinist Saul Davies were enlisted to produce most of the recordings.

Inspired by playing the new songs live, the band decided to gather in a circle and record live-in-the-studio at Ridge Farm Studios in Capel, Surrey with engineer Gary Langan. Eno likened the process to when artists make their debut record: "they're full of enthusiasm and excitement and they know what they're doing and it's a pleasure." Additional production was done by KK, at the suggestion of Eno, and drummer David Baynton-Power. All of the songs recorded here were mixed by Dave Bascombe at Whitfield St. Studios in London. The remainder of the tracks were credited to different producers: "Falling Down" by Eno and KK; "The Shining", "Give It Away" and "Getting Away with It (All Messed Up)" by James and Eno; "Gaudi" by James and Baynton-Power; "What Is It Good For" by James; "Fine" by James, Eno and KK; and "Alaskan Pipeline" by James. Bascombe did additional recording and engineering at Whitfield.

"The Shining", "Getting Away with It (All Messed Up)" and "Alaskan Pipeline" were engineered by James Loughrey. "The Shining", "Senorita", "Gaudi", "What Is It Good For" and "Getting Away with It (All Messed Up)" were recorded at House in the Woods in Bletchingley. "Gaudi" was engineered by Tim Pettit and Baynton-Power. "What Is It Good For" was engineered by Pettit and mixed by him, James and Bascombe at House in the Woods and Whitfield. KK did additional recording for it and "Getting Away with It (All Messed Up)". "Fine" was engineered by Loughrey and KK, with additional engineering by Simon Changer. The sessions concluded in January 2001; the recording days consisted of 18-hour periods. Most of the finished album was made up from live takes and demos that were made before recording with Eno. Mixing began in late January 2001 and finished in March.

== Composition ==
Musically, Pleased to Meet You has been described as stadium rock. It was originally titled We Want Our Money Back, before being re-titled Space, and eventually Pleased to Meet You. Explaining its final name, Booth said the album felt like it would be the band's last. He added that the album had an underlying theme of distaste for "habits, addictions, [and] impulses that we can't control. Different characters expressing their particular loops." Booth said the album was the first since their fifth studio album Laid (1993) that they had strayed from the Verse-chorus-verse structure.

"Space" begins as a Radiohead-esque track with an electro intro before shifting into chorus sections in the vein of Simple Minds. In the context of the song's pre-chorus, Booth said that "[s]cientifically we are made up of about 96% space," which he found interesting. Discussing "Falling Down", Booth said after recording a jam with Eno, it was given to KK. He edited the track; after giving Booth a copy, he re-did the vocal take, resulting in the final version. The lyrics refer to a mad, eccentric woman coming into power. The bass part was compared to the one heard in "Material Girl" by Madonna. "English Beefcake" stars a man who ends relationships, while being hesitant in causing pain as a result of them. The song's first verse describes pain and misunderstanding that arises in relationships. "Junkie" talks about compulsive behaviour, and sees Booth singing through an answerphone. Booth compared "The Shining" to Nick Cave and the Bad Seeds' "The Ship Song" (1990).

"Senorita" is about a guy that falls in love with a dangerous woman, and is followed by the disco song "Gaudi". "Give It Away" recalled the works of the Go-Betweens, and is about needing a frequent reminder to let go. "Fine" is a percussion-led song that is followed by "Getting Away with It (All Messed Up)", a slow-building indie rock track with a psychedelic bridge section. Davies said every instrument on the track was unintentionally out of tune. It talks about a guy called Daniel who saves a woman called Grace from drowning, and unbeknownst to him, saving her helps him save himself. Its original title was "Saving Grace"; the label had it changed as they reasoned the public wouldn't buy it with that title. A year after its release, it occurred to Booth that the song was about his son, whose middle name was Daniel, and his goddaughter Grace. "Alaskan Pipeline" is a minimalist ballad about a son's relationship with his mother. The song's title refers to the cold nature of its narrator.

== Release ==
"Getting Away with It (All Messed Up)" premiered on BBC Radio 1 on 18 May 2001; the band appeared on Later... with Jools Holland later that day, and performed "Falling Down" and "Getting Away with It (All Messed Up)". On 31 May, Pleased to Meet You was announced for release in July, and the track listing was revealed. Alongside this announcement, a remix of "Fine", done by Baynton-Power, was available from the band's website. "Getting Away with It (All Messed Up)" was released as a single on 25 June, after being delayed a week from its original release date. Two versions were released on CD: one with "Make It Alright" and "So Swell", and the other with "Stand" and a live version of "The Shining". The song's music video was directed by Gordon Main, Rob Leggatt, and Simon Earith. On 19 June, Dotmusic revealed the album's artwork, which is a computer-generated image that merged all of the members' faces. Pleased to Meet You was released on 2 July 2001 through Mercury Records. The UK special edition included the bonus songs "Gaudi" and "What Is It Good For" as 9th and 10th tracks. On 6 July, the band performed on Top of the Pops.

Throughout July and September, the band performed at the T in the Park, Guildford Live, City in the Park, Witnness, Benicàssim, and Annual Youth Music festivals, across the UK, Spain and Portugal. On 6 September, the band announced their departure from Mercury after completing their six-album contract, though they planned to release a compilation and reissue their back catalogue in the future through the label. Following this, they played the Electron Festival in Greece at the end of the month. On 29 October, Booth announced he would be leaving the band after their current tour engagements, with the band aiming to continue recording. At the end of November, the band played a few shows in Spain and Portugal, leading up to a UK tour in December. Ben Folds was initially scheduled to support the band for their UK stint, but was replaced by Turin Brakes. Coinciding with this, the B-side compilation B-Sides Ultra was released on 3 December. On 24 December, a remix of "Fine", done by Hunter, was available from the band's website. The Manchester date of their December tour was filmed and later released as the live/video album Getting Away with It...Live in June 2002.

"English Beefcake" and "Getting Away with It (All Messed Up)" were included on the band's third compilation album The Collection (2004). "Getting Away with It (All Messed Up)" was included on the band's fourth compilation album Fresh as a Daisy – The Singles (2007). "Scratchcard" and "I Thought You Were", outtakes from the album's sessions, were included on the career-spanning box set The Gathering Sound (2012), alongside the music video for "Getting Away with It (All Messed Up)". Pleased to Meet You was pressed on vinyl for the first time in 2017.

== Reception ==
Professional ratings
Aggregate scores
Source	Rating
Metacritic	65/100
Review scores
Source	Rating
AllMusic	4.5/5 stars
The Guardian	3/5
NME	6/10
Q	2/5 stars
Playlouder	3.5/5 stars
Martin C. Strong	6/10
Uncut	3/5 stars

Pleased to Meet You was met with generally favourable from music critics. At Metacritic, which assigns a normalized rating out of 100 to reviews from mainstream publications, the album received an average score of 65, based on six reviews. AllMusic reviewer Andy Kellman said it wasn't "just another good James record -- it's their best." He expanded: "It's their tightest, freshest, most contemporary batch of songs, weatherproofed to stand the test of time." ChartAttack wrote that fans of the band's earlier hits, such as "Sit Down" and "Laid", would be "disappointed with this disc," however, "longtime James fans should find much to enjoy." Though noting it wasn't as "adventurous" of a release as Wah Wah is, the band made a record "whose songs are often times spacious and funky at the same time." Dotmusic writer Dave Jennings wasn't fond of the band leaving pop; "it's just unfortunate that their chosen alternative often seems to be stadium rock." He said the band's attempts at taking risks produced the record's "best moments."

Playlouder's Sarah Bee considered it a "more low-key" affair that was "less brash" than Millionaires. The high moments are "safer and its lows more thoughtful and safe." Though, this "doesn't mean it's not rather good. Cos it is." Andrew Paine of NME considered it the "best James record in a long while and there are some near-inspirational moments." It was a "smartly dressed record" that could make the band "feel at least slightly relevant again. Ultimately, though, there's a more brutal solution to that problem." In a review for The Guardian, Caroline Sullivan wrote that the band "continue their run of mini-symphonies by and for men who don't cringe at terms such as 'birthing partner'."

Pleased to Meet You reached number 11 on the UK albums chart. It was certified silver by the British Phonographic Industry (BPI). "Getting Away with It (All Messed Up)" charted at number 22 on the UK singles chart. It was certified silver by the BPI in September 2023. Clash included "Getting Away with It (All Messed Up)" on their list of the top 10 best James songs.

== Track listing ==
All tracks written by Tim Booth, Jim Glennie, Saul Davies, Mark Hunter, David Baynton-Power.

No.	Title	Producer	Length
1.	"Space"	Brian Eno; Saul Davies	4:49
2.	"Falling Down"	Eno; KK	3:36
3.	"English Beefcake"	Eno; Davies	5:46
4.	"Junkie"	Eno; Davies	4:56
5.	"Pleased to Meet You"	Eno; Davies	5:37
6.	"The Shining"	James; Eno	4:26
7.	"Senorita"	Eno; Davies	3:10
8.	"Give It Away"	James; Eno	3:05
9.	"Fine"	James; Eno; KK	3:41
10.	"Getting Away with It (All Messed Up)"	James; Eno	4:29
11.	"Alaskan Pipeline"	James	4:28
Total length:			48:05

UK special edition bonus tracks
No.	Title	Producer	Length
8.	"Gaudi"	James; David Baynton-Power	3:17
9.	"What Is It Good For"	James	4:12
Total length:			55:32

== Personnel ==
Personnel per booklet.

James

- Tim Booth – lead vocals
- Jim Glennie – bass guitars
- Adrian Oxaal – guitar, cello
- Michael Kulas – guitar
- Saul Davies – guitar, violin
- Mark Hunter – keyboards
- David Baynton-Power – drums

Production

- Brian Eno – producer
- Saul Davies – producer
- Kevin Kerrigan – additional production
- David Baynton-Power – additional production
- Gary Langan – engineer
- Dave Bascombe – mixing, additional recording, additional engineering
- KK – producer (tracks 2 and 9), engineer (track 9), additional recording (track 10)
- James – producer (tracks 6, 8, 9 and 10)
- James Loughrey – engineer (tracks 6, 9, 10 and 11)
- Simon Changer – additional engineer (track 9)
- Blue Source – art direction
- Phil Poynter – photography
- Becci Manson – photographic retouching

== Charts and certifications ==
=== Weekly charts ===
Chart performance for Pleased to Meet You
Chart (2001)	Peak position
Australian Albums (ARIA)	115
UK Albums (Official Charts)	11

=== Certifications ===
Certifications for Pleased to Meet You
Region	Certification	Certified units/sales
United Kingdom (BPI)	Silver	60,000^{^}
^{^} Shipments figures based on certification alone.
