= Booth and the Bad Angel =

British musical project

Booth and the Bad Angel was a British musical project based on the collaborative efforts of Tim Booth (lead singer with the British alternative rock band James) and the American film composer Angelo Badalamenti. Featuring Bernard Butler on guitar, the project's eponymous album was released in July 1996.

== Biography ==
The collaboration between Booth and Badalamenti began in 1992, when Booth made an appearance on the UK Channel 4 TV show Friday Night at the Dome, which set up collaborations between contemporary musicians and their heroes. Booth expressed his desire to work with Badalamenti, and the show's producers put the two in touch. At the time, Booth was busy recording and touring with James, so could not find the time to meet with Badalamenti, but the two kept in touch via transatlantic phone calls for more than two years before finally meeting. In 1995, Booth announced he would be taking a break from James to work on an album with Badalamenti. Booth contacted Butler, recently departed from Suede to provide guitar work for the album, which was recorded through late 1995 to early 1996. The album was finally released in August 1996 and promoted by the single "I Believe", which made number 25 in the UK Singles Chart.

Following several live performances, Butler invited Booth to form a new band with him, but Booth declined, having promised the other members of James that he would return to them following his break. Upon returning to the UK, Booth and the Bad Angel featured on Later... with Jools Holland, with James as the backing band for this performance.

While Booth and the Bad Angel was to remain a pure one-off project, a further single from the album, "Fall in Love with Me", was released in 1998 (UK number 57), when it was used on the soundtrack to the film Martha, Meet Frank, Daniel and Laurence. This track was later reworked by Booth on his 2004 solo album Bone.

== Discography ==
Studio albums

- Booth and the Bad Angel (1996)

Singles

- "I Believe" (1996)
- "Fall in Love with Me" (1998)
