= Michael Kulas =

Canadian singer-songwriter

Michael Wade Kulas
- Born: January 27, 1969 (age 57); Oakville, Ontario, Canada
- Genres: Rock, pop
- Occupation: Singer-songwriter
- Years active: 1991–present
- Labels: Interloper, 1A
- Formerly of: James (1997–2001)
- Spouse: Katie Griffin (m. 2004)
- Children: 2

Michael Wade Kulas (born January 27, 1969) is a Canadian singer and songwriter who was a member of the English rock band James between 1997 and 2001.

== Personal life ==
Kulas was born in Oakville, Ontario, Canada on January 27, 1969. His family relocated to Lakefield, Ontario in the early 1980s where he attended the prestigious Lakefield College School from 1982 to 1987. He is married to Canadian actress Katie Griffin with whom he has two sons named Jett and Wyatt.

== Career ==
Although part of many independent Toronto music projects in the late 1980s and early 1990s, it was not until 1995 that his professional career began to take off. Having been granted the FACTOR New Talent Demo Award for music that year and being runner up in the Toronto radio station Q107's Scott Liddle Songwriters Award, Kulas also released his first solo studio album titled Mosquito. Produced by Saul Davies, multi-instrumentalist with the British rock band James, it went on to be hailed as one of Canada's "top 20 independent albums" of 1995/1996 by Chart magazine. The album would also gain the attention of James front man Tim Booth who midway through 1996 and at the behest of producer Brian Eno was considering filling the vocal void created when guitarist and backing vocalist Larry Gott departed in 1995.

In January 1997 Kulas was invited by James to New York as a backing vocalist and multi-instrumentalist to test the waters with a handful of American shows and an appearance on Late Show with David Letterman. The ad-hoc "audition" would prove to be a success and garner an invitation for Kulas to join the band in the UK for what would turn out to be a five-year period.

In performing with James, Kulas was a singer and multi-instrumentalist on 4 Top 40 albums including Whiplash, the number one The Best Of, Millionaires and Pleased To Meet You. In that time he and the band toured extensively in Asia, South Africa, Europe and North America, including the Lollapalooza Festival and Glastonbury Festival in 1997. In the UK, James continued to perform sold out Arena Tours including Wembley and Manchester Evening News Arena and also played to a live TV audience of 500 million as the torch was passed from Kuala Lumpur to Manchester for the 2002 Commonwealth Games. After a decision by singer Booth to leave James to pursue other interests in December 2001 saw the band informally break up, Kulas returned home to Canada to pick up where he left his solo career years before.

In 2002 he completed his second, self-produced solo album titled Another Small Machine while performing many live shows across Canada. In keeping with his passion for film, Kulas also went on to compose and perform music for the film Jade Love which won the 2004 Best Short Documentary at the Reel Film Festival in Toronto as well as composing original music for the Park Bench feature film The Death Of Alice Blue in 2006. His composing skills have also seen him cross over to writing music for television. In that same year Kulas wrote and produced the theme song for the Marathon animated series Team Galaxy on The Cartoon Network as well as producing full-length albums for artists Katie Griffin and Stephanie Belding. His first EP titled Imperial Cheerleader was released in December 2006 exclusively through Apple iTunes.

In January 2007, after a six-year absence, James re-formed, this time with the original band member line up from the 1992 album Seven. While performing in Toronto to promote their 10th studio album, Hey Ma, in September 2008, Kulas joined the band on stage for a selection of songs that included "Just Like Fred Astaire", "Five-O" and "Destiny Calling".

== Discography ==
- Mosquito (LP/1995/1A Records)
- Another Small Machine (LP/2001/Interloper Records)
- Imperial Cheerleader (EP/2006/Interloper Records)
