= Sharkboy =

English rock band

- Origin: Brighton, England, United Kingdom
- Genres: Alternative rock
- Years active: Early 1990s–Present
- Labels: Nude Sign Of The Sharkboy Studio
- Past members: Avy; Adrian Oxaal; Alan Stirner; Gavin Cheyne; Dil Davies; Nick Wilson; Jessica Fischer

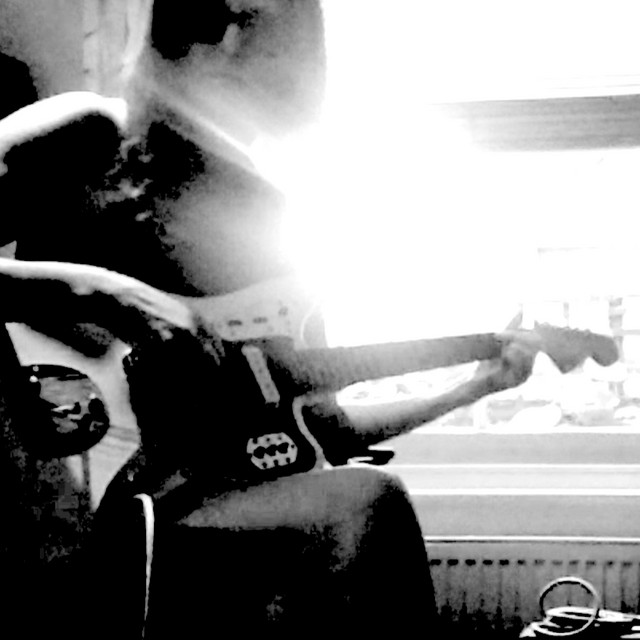
Sharkboy

Sharkboy is an alternative rock artist, formerly the band from Brighton, England, formed and led from the early 1990s by Avy, lead singer, songwriter and guitarist. She first released albums with Nude Records, home of Suede, and continues to release independently through her creative audio-visual studio.

The current outfit features Avy as solo artist Sharkboy, with collaborators including Adrian Oxaal and Brightons Madonovan, along with guest musicians. She also regularly co-hosts 'Record Club' on Brighton radio station Slack City Radio.

== History ==
Sharkboy band was formed in the early 1990s by Preston-born Avy (vocals, guitar), recruiting American-born Oxaal (guitar, cello, keyboards) and multi-instrumentalist Gavin Cheyne on bass. The band signed to Nude Records after being championed by Brett Anderson of Suede and released their debut album Matinee in 1994, which was described by CMJ New Music Monthly as "moody aggression with bite", and by Allmusic writer Ned Raggett as "an enjoyable, moody debut". Everett True wrote in Melody Maker that Matinee possessed ‘a sensuous collage of sounds which plays havoc with the emotions’. Original members included Toby Shippey (trumpet), Dil Davies (drums, percussion) Alan Stirner (guitar) and Nick Wilson (keyboards, trumpet, percussion). Four singles in 1995 preceded the band's second album, The Valentine Tapes, which included Dickon Hinchcliffe of Tindersticks on violin. The band carried on in various forms, including drummer Steve Hewitt joining the outfit following the departure of Dil Davies. They released a limited edition 500 vinyl boxed set featuring cover versions of lounge classics and a thrash feedback version of the Serge Gainsbourg penned "Je t'aime... moi non plus" which remains a rarity. Following the demobbing of original members after the second album's release, Avy, Adrian Oxaal and Jessica Fischer (bass/cello) played to appreciative audiences in New York and Los Angeles in 1997.

== Musical style ==
The band has been compared to My Bloody Valentine, Mazzy Star, Drugstore, Tindersticks, and Mojave 3. On the band's second album, Allmusic identified a "blend of country, blues, post-punk textures".

== Discography ==
=== Albums ===
- Matinee (1994), Nude
- The Valentine Tapes (1995), Nude

=== Singles ===
- "Crystaline" (1993), Nude
- "Razor" (1994), Nude
- "Big Black Jaguar" (1995), Nude
- "Little Leopard" (1995), Nude
- "My Magnetic Susan" (1995), Nude
- "Tiny Seismic Night" (1995), Nude
- "Spell" (2018) Firehorse! Recordings
