= She's a Star =

1997 single by James

Single by James

from the album Whiplash
- B-side: "Stutter" (live); "Johnny Yen" (live); "Chunney Chops"; "Fishknives"; "Van Gogh's Dog"; "Come Home" (remix)
- Released: 10 February 1997
- Length: 3:39
- Label: Fontana
- Songwriter: James
- Producer: Stephen Hague

James singles chronology
"Jam J" / "Say Something" (1994)	"She's a Star" (1997)	"Tomorrow" (1997)

"She's a Star" is a song written and performed by British alternative rock band James. It was released on 10 February 1997 as the first single from their seventh studio album, Whiplash (1997). "She's a Star" reached number nine on the UK Singles Chart and became a brief hit in Australia and Canada. The song was certified silver by the British Phonographic Industry (BPI) in December 2020 for sales and streams exceeding 200,000 units.

== Chart performance ==
Reaching number nine on the UK Singles Chart, "She's a Star" became the group's third top-10 single and their first since 1991. As of 2026, it is their last UK top-10 single.

== Music video ==
The video for the single features British actress Keeley Hawes.

== Track listings ==
UK CD1

1. "She's a Star" – 3:39
2. "Stutter" (live) – 6:52
3. "Johnny Yen" (live) – 6:46

UK CD2 and Australian CD single

1. "She's a Star" – 3:39
2. "Chunney Chops" – 4:58
3. "Fishknives" – 3:51
4. "Van Gogh's Dog" – 4:06

UK CD3

1. "She's a Star" 3:39
2. "Come Home" (Weatherall remix) – 8:26
3. "She's a Star" (Dave Angel's 'Pat' remix) – 5:30
4. "She's a Star" (Andrea's Biosphere mix) – 7:06

European CD single

1. "She's a Star" – 3:39
2. "Chunney Chops" – 4:58

== Charts ==
=== Weekly charts ===
Chart (1997)	Peak position
Australia (ARIA)	149
Canada Top Singles (RPM)	61
Europe (Eurochart Hot 100)	43
Israel (IBA)	25
Scottish Singles Sales (Official Charts)	6
UK Singles (Official Charts)	9

=== Year-end charts ===
Chart (1997)	Position
UK Singles (OCC)	190

== Certifications ==
Region	Certification	Certified units/sales
United Kingdom (BPI)	Silver	200,000^{‡}
^{‡} Sales+streaming figures based on certification alone.

== Release history ==
Region	Date	Format(s)	Label(s)	Ref(s).
United States	27 January 1997	Alternative radio	Fontana	
United Kingdom	10 February 1997	CD	Fontana	
