= Bc magazine =

bc magazine was a free bi-weekly English-language arts and entertainment magazine in Hong Kong. It was published between 1994 and 2011 by Carpe Diem Publications Limited, with fresh issues available at bars, restaurants and coffee shops throughout the HK SAR on the first and third Thursdays of each month. At its height, it has a print-run of 40,000 copies. In addition to targeting Hong Kong's English-speaking 20- to 35-year-old residents, the magazine also provided event updates to tourists, and was once recommended in Lonely Planet's Hong Kong & Macau City Guide as a "highly visual and glossy publication," useful for its "complete listing of bars and clubs."

== History and profile ==
bc magazine was founded in 1994 as a monthly magazine by the publication's then editor-in-chief and publisher, Simon Durrant. Since its inaugural September 1994 issue, the magazine's print-run ranged between 60,000 and 40,000 copies.

The magazine was distributed free of charge at approximately 700 predominately commercial venues (bars, restaurants, cafes and hotels) throughout Hong Kong Island, Kowloon, and the New Territories.

The 50-page, glossy color magazine usually included several one- to three-page lifestyle, arts and live music features, in addition to its regular sections. These sections comprised:

Editor's Bit and Editor's Diary: The letter from the editor and paragraph-long highlights from major events in Hong Kong during the issue dates.
Features: One- to three-page articles on current lifestyle trends, performance previews, food, interviews with musicians and directors.
Yuan Yang: Short updates on Hong Kong's newest trends, hypes and products.
Spike Column: Spike's thoughts and observations on music, technology, current events and everything in between.
Live Music: Approximately five pages of interviews, previews and updates on Hong Kong's live music scene.
Mando Beat
Club Scene: Included "Beat 'n Tracks," a listing of DJ gigs, and the "Angel Interview," a chat with prominent local figures in the club and DJ industry.
Barfly: Updates on bar- and alcohol-related promotions and events.
bcene: Centerfold of snapshots from nightlife events.
Megabites: Restaurant descriptions and updates, focusing on new openings, trends, seasonal themes.
Listings: An extensive list of film, dance, and theatre events, arranged by day.
Cinema: Reviews, previews, and director interviews of upcoming films.
Sport & Leisure: Listings, previews, and short features on upcoming sporting events.
Macau: Comprised "Macau Diary," paragraph-long descriptions of upcoming events in Macau, and short features on Macau.
Backside: Divided into three sections: "Hi-5," short street-side, single-question interviews with five random pedestrians; "Findery," featuring a "cheap, sometimes nasty" product available locally; "Stopwatch," a visitor's guide to a particular HK MTR station.

== Affiliated Projects ==
Apart from the periodical itself, bc magazine also provided the following side projects:

The Golden Durian Awards In its sixth year, the Golden Durian highlights the year's best, worst, and most ridiculous works and personalities of Hong Kong cinema.

bc Unplugged: A monthly music showcase of local acoustic talent, hosted at The Wanch bar and live music venue in Wanchai.

Vision Hong Kong: Annual thematic photo contest.
