= Team Galaxy (TV series) =

Animated TV series

- The Young Trio (Yoko, Brett and Josh) and their pet Fluffy.
- Genre: Action; Sci-fi; Animated sitcom Adventure
- Created by: Vincent Chalvon-Demersay; David Michel; Michelle Lamoreaux; Robert Lamoreaux
- Written by: Michelle Lamoureux; Robert Lamoureux; Nicole Demerse; Rhonda Smiley; Richard Clark; Franklin Young
- Directed by: Stephane Berry
- Starring: French: Dorothée Pousséo; Emmanuel Garijo; Fily Keita; Patrick Poivey; Donald Reignoux; English: Katie Griffin; Kirby Morrow; Tabitha St. Germain; Cathy Weseluck; Brian Dobson
- Theme music composer: Michael Kulas
- Composer: Paul-Étienne Côté
- Countries of origin: France; Canada; Italy
- Original languages: French; English
- No. of seasons: 2
- No. of episodes: 52 (list of episodes)

Production
- Executive producers: Vincent Chalvon-Demersay; Sylvain Viau; Eve Baron; Michael Lekes; Lucia Bolzoni
- Producers: Vincent Chalvon-Demersay; David Michel
- Running time: 22 minutes
- Production companies: Marathon Media Group; Image Entertainment Corporation; Rai Fiction

Original release
- Network: France 3 (France); Rai 2 (Italy); YTV (Canada); Vrak (Canada)
- Release: 26 August 2006 – 8 March 2008

Team Galaxy (French: Team Galaxy, le Collège de l'Espace or Galaxie Académie in Quebec) is an science fiction action animated series co-produced by Marathon Media, Image Entertainment Corporation, France 3, Rai Fiction and Jetix Europe in association with YTV. It blends 2D animation with computer graphics (CG) elements, and is set at Galaxy High, where a trio of young students try to balance their teenage lives with their training to become Space Marshals. The concept and animation style is similar to that of Totally Spies! and Martin Mystery, other series created by Marathon Media.

Team Galaxy is co-produced by several international broadcasters, including France 3, which was the first to begin airing it starting on 26 August 2006. In the United States, Cartoon Network paid Marathon about $16–$17 million for 52 episodes and a premiere in fall 2006. It also aired on Canada's YTV and CITV/Jetix in the United Kingdom.

== Plot ==
The series follows Yoko, Josh, and Brett, a group of friends who are students at the school Galaxy High, a galactic justice authority which defends the galaxy against criminals and sends its students on missions as part of their training to become Space Marshals. The series appears to be set in the present, but in one episode, a calendar says that the year is 2051, suggesting that it actually takes place in that year.

The 3 part episode Predator Plants From Outer Space introduces Omni, an android who is a student from another school and is searching for his classmates after the alien bounty hunter Gangus destroyed the school. He is convinced to stay at Galaxy High for the time being and Josh, Brett, Yoko, and the rest of Galaxy High promise to help him.

== Characters ==
=== Students ===
- Yoko (Kiko in the French dub): A 15-year-old girl who is creative, loves karaoke and fashion, and aspires to be a pop singer, seeing Galaxy High as just one step in her way to stardom. Despite her terrible singing, she is able to win many interstellar competitions, as aliens think her voice is music while Josh and Brett are pained by it. On missions, she is easily distracted when a talent competition or something that could boost her career pops up, with her desire for stardom and fame often placing the group in danger. She has a crush on Seth. She is in the same team as Josh and Brett. Her suit as a space marshal is light purple, and she primarily wields a sonic blaster. She is voiced by Dorothée Pousséo in French and Katie Griffin in English.
- Josh Kirkpatrick: A 17-year-old boy who is rebellious and an adrenaline junkie. He prefers training to learning, as he mostly fails his classes but succeeds on missions. He was afraid of water after a childhood incident in which he lost his swimming trunks, but overcomes it after facing it head-on. Despite his recklessness, Josh's independent thinking is a valuable asset to the team. His father, Principal Kirkpatrick, is the principal of Galaxy High. He is in the same team as Brett and Yoko, and his suit as a space marshal is dark blue. He is voiced by Emmanuel Garijo in French and Kirby Morrow in English.
- Brett: A 10-year-old boy who is a headstrong genius and, despite his brilliance, feels restricted by his age and hates being called a "kid". Despite his age, Brett takes missions more seriously than Yoko and Josh and is most sensible of the group, but is often ignored because of his age. He is in the same team as Josh and Yoko. His suit as a space marshal is red, and he uses his personal computer to control the hornet, analyze DNA, and use Gluefoam. He is voiced by Fily Keita in French and Tabitha St. Germain in English.
- Bobby Von Poppin: One of Yoko and Josh's rivals from Galaxy High, who is skilled and has high grades. He is competitive and egotistical, and often brags to others about his skills. He is in the same team as Toby and Kimbal, and his suit as a space marshal is purple. He is voiced by Donald Reignoux in French and Sam Vincent in English.
- Toby McMaster: A girl who seeks to prove that she is the toughest student on campus and to be the center of attention, which annoys Yoko. Josh describes her as the cutest and most popular girl in school. She is in the same team as Bobby and Kimball, and her suit as a space marshal is yellow.
- Princess Kimball: A princess whose privileged upbringing has made her naive and oblivious about other students. She is in the same team as Bobby and Toby, and like Toby, her suit as a space marshal is yellow. She is voiced by Fily Keita in French and Katie Griffin in English.
- Spavid: One of the few alien students at Galaxy High, who is well liked by others despite his clumsiness. After growing into adulthood, he developed superhuman powers and enhanced reflexes, but chose to suppress them after letting them get to his head. He is in the same team as Ryan (Orion) and Andi (Andromeda), and his suit as a space marshal is purple. He is voiced by Donald Reignoux in French and Sam Vincent in English.
- Orion and Andromeda: They are from outer space, but on Earth they are known as "global citizens" and adopted the names Ryan and Andi. Ryan's suit as a space marshal is presumably purple, while Andi's suit is presumably yellow, like typical space marshals. They are Spavid's teammates.
- Seth: A talented musician and Yoko's love interest. He once seemed aloof and uninterested in her, but in reality he did not speak to avoid straining his voice and was too shy to ask her out. His suit as a space marshal and his team remain unknown.

=== Teachers ===
- Principal Kirkpatrick (Sarge): Josh's father. A former commander of a military academy who was brought in to be principal of Galaxy High. Despite his stern demeanor, he has a cheerful personality. He is afraid of speaking in front of large crowds, but overcomes his fears after reading Yoko's book on overcoming stage fright. It is said that Captain Smith is his longtime friend. He is voiced by Patrick Poivey in French and Brian Dobson in English.
- Mrs. Schragger: Galaxy High's astronomy teacher, who has heightened senses of hearing and vision, making cheating in her classroom impossible.
- Mr. S (Spzoerscliipw’): The team's favorite teacher, despite his unattractive physical appearance by human standards. He is voiced by Andrew Toth in English.
- Mr. Fitch: A fast-talking space cowboy who is in charge of showing new equipment to marshals and is notorious among students for assigning large amounts of homework. He is voiced by Lee Tockar in English.
- Ms. Roskoff: A Russian ex-cosmonaut who teaches Space Investigation Training and is the school's most athletic instructor.

=== UltraPets ===
On the first day of school at Galaxy High, each student is assigned a pet robot called an UltraPet, who serves as their aide and companion. When provoked, an Ultrapet can transform into a powerful fighting machine and are capable of immobilizing enemies.

- Fluffy: Yoko's UltraPet, a robotic weasel who behaves like a dog and helps the students in their missions. He is capable of transforming into a bipedal attack mode and can speak human language.
- Spike: Toby's UltraPet.

=== Technology ===
==== Hornet ====
Mission ships for interplanetary travel that can be flown by one person, but are usually piloted by three. Losing a Hornet while not completing a mission results in expulsion from Galaxy High if it is not recovered. Hornets are armed with two forward missile launchers, two manned turrets, and one automated turret at the top. They can carry a Six-by-Six or a cargo container in the rear.

==== Shuttle ====
Massive aerospace aircraft carriers owned by Galaxy High, which are the personal flagship of Director Kirkpatrick. They mainly serve to transport Defenders, as well as Hornets for some missions.

==== Gluefoam ====
A purple glue-like substance which serves to incapacitate a person or patch a planet together and dissolves upon contact with skin.

==== Defender ====
Small, lightweight ships used primarily in the defense of Earth and Galaxy High which require shuttles to transport them to their destinations. Each Defender is equipped with various weapons, including laser blasters and missiles. Josh, Yoko, and Brett each have one of the three main types of Defenders.

== Credits ==
- Producers: Vincent Chalvon Demersay and David Michel
- Director: Stephane Berry
- Storyboard Supervisor: Damien Tromel
- Character designer: Eddie Mehong and Fabien Mense
- Mechanical designer: David Cannoville
- Supervision: Eddie Mehong
- Overseas animation studio: Digital eMation
- Ink, Paint and Compositing: ToutenKartoon Canada
- Post Production: ToutenKartoon Canada
- Music: Paul-Étienne Côté

== Music ==
- Title Music: Michael Kulas
- OST: David Vadant and Noam Kaniel for Kia Productions
- Specific Music: Paul-Étienne Côté for CirconFlex Productions
