= Booth and the Bad Angel (album) =

Studio album by Booth and the Bad Angel
- Released: 6 August 1996
- Studio: Excalibur Recording Studio, New York City
- Genre: Alternative rock
- Length: 47:02
- Label: Fontana
- Producer: Angelo Badalamenti; Tim Booth; Bernard Butler; Tim Simenon

Singles from Booth and the Bad Angel
- 1. "I Believe" Released: 1996; 2. "Fall in Love with Me" Released: 1998

Professional ratings
Review scores
Source	Rating
AllMusic	3/5 stars

Booth and the Bad Angel is a studio album by Booth and the Bad Angel, a collaborative project between Angelo Badalamenti and Tim Booth. It was released on 6 August 1996. It peaked at number 35 on the UK Albums Chart.

== Track listing ==
All tracks are written by Angelo Badalamenti and Tim Booth.

No.	Title	Length
1.	"I Believe"	2:57
2.	"Dance of the Bad Angels"	4:33
3.	"Hit Parade"	3:17
4.	"Fall in Love with Me"	4:18
5.	"Old Ways"	4:11
6.	"Life Gets Better"	4:29
7.	"Heart"	3:58
8.	"Rising"	2:50
9.	"Butterfly's Dream"	7:25
10.	"Stranger"	4:07
11.	"Hands in the Rain"	4:57

Japanese edition bonus track
No.	Title	Length
12.	"When You Smiled"	3:44

== Personnel ==
Credits adapted from liner notes.

- Tim Booth – vocals, words
- Angelo Badalamenti – keyboards, vocals (on 6 and 9)
- Bernard Butler – guitar (on 1, 3, 6, 7, 9 and 10), percussion (on 1), piano (on 5 and 10), bass guitar (on 10)
- Mark Egan – bass guitar (on 1, 2, 3, 4, 5, 6, 7, 8, 9 and 11)
- Graham Hawthorne – drums (on 1, 3, 6, 8, 9, 10 and 11)
- Chloe Goodchild – vocals (on 2, 4 and 8)
- Ira Siegel – guitar (on 2, 4, 5, 8 and 11)
- Jeff Mironov – guitar (on 2 and 5)
- Gota – drums (on 2 and 4)
- Makoto Sakamoto – drums (on 5 and 7)
- Allison Cornell – vocals (on 5 and 7)
- Joy Askew – vocals (on 7)
- Brian Eno – vocals (on 9)

== Charts ==
Chart	Peak position
UK Albums (OCC)	35
