= Type-2 fuzzy sets and systems =

System of logic in computer science

Type-2 fuzzy sets and systems generalize standard type-1 fuzzy sets and systems so that more uncertainty can be handled. From the beginning of fuzzy sets, criticism was made about the fact that the membership function of a type-1 fuzzy set has no uncertainty associated with it, something that seems to contradict the word fuzzy, since that word has the connotation of much uncertainty. So, what does one do when there is uncertainty about the value of the membership function? The answer to this question was provided in 1975 by the inventor of fuzzy sets, Lotfi A. Zadeh, when he proposed more sophisticated kinds of fuzzy sets, the first of which he called a "type-2 fuzzy set". A type-2 fuzzy set lets us incorporate uncertainty about the membership function into fuzzy set theory, and is a way to address the above criticism of type-1 fuzzy sets head-on. And, if there is no uncertainty, then a type-2 fuzzy set reduces to a type-1 fuzzy set, which is analogous to probability reducing to determinism when unpredictability vanishes.

Type1 fuzzy systems are working with a fixed membership function, while in type-2 fuzzy systems the membership function is fluctuating. A fuzzy set determines how input values are converted into fuzzy variables.

== Overview ==
In order to symbolically distinguish between a type-1 fuzzy set and a type-2 fuzzy set, a tilde symbol is put over the symbol for the fuzzy set; so, A denotes a type-1 fuzzy set, whereas Ã denotes the comparable type-2 fuzzy set. When the latter is done, the resulting type-2 fuzzy set is called a "general type-2 fuzzy set" (to distinguish it from the special interval type-2 fuzzy set).

Zadeh didn't stop with type-2 fuzzy sets, because in that 1976 paper he also generalized all of this to type-n fuzzy sets. The present article focuses only on type-2 fuzzy sets because they are the next step in the logical progression from type-1 to type-n fuzzy sets, where n = 1, 2, ... . Although some researchers are beginning to explore higher than type-2 fuzzy sets, as of early 2009, this work is in its infancy.

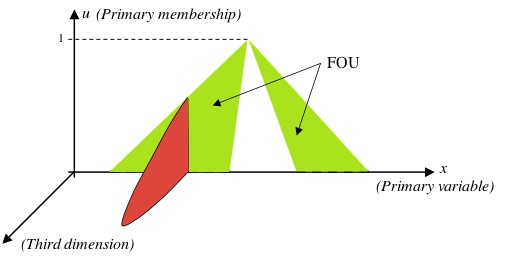
Figure 1. The membership function of a general type-2 fuzzy set is three-dimensional. A cross-section of one slice of the third dimension is shown. This cross-section, as well as all others, sits on the FOU. Only the boundary of the cross-section is used to describe the membership function of a general type-2 fuzzy set. It is shown filled-in for artistic purposes.

The membership function of a general type-2 fuzzy set, Ã, is three-dimensional (Fig. 1), where the third dimension is the value of the membership function at each point on its two-dimensional domain that is called its "footprint of uncertainty"(FOU).

For an interval type-2 fuzzy set that third-dimension value is the same (e.g., 1) everywhere, which means that no new information is contained in the third dimension of an interval type-2 fuzzy set. So, for such a set, the third dimension is ignored, and only the FOU is used to describe it. It is for this reason that an interval type-2 fuzzy set is sometimes called a first-order uncertainty fuzzy set model, whereas a general type-2 fuzzy set (with its useful third-dimension) is sometimes referred to as a second-order uncertainty fuzzy set model.

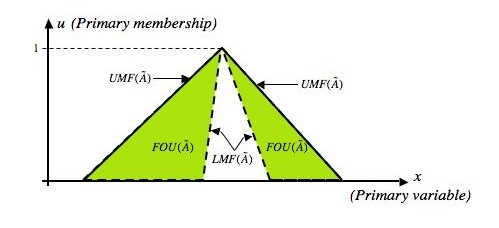
Figure 2. FOU for an interval type-2 fuzzy set. Many other shapes are possible for the FOU.

The FOU represents the blurring of a type-1 membership function, and is completely described by its two bounding functions (Fig. 2), a lower membership function (LMF) and an upper membership function (UMF), both of which are type-1 fuzzy sets! Consequently, it is possible to use type-1 fuzzy set mathematics to characterize and work with interval type-2 fuzzy sets. This means that engineers and scientists who already know type-1 fuzzy sets will not have to invest a lot of time learning about general type-2 fuzzy set mathematics in order to understand and use interval type-2 fuzzy sets.

Work on type-2 fuzzy sets languished during the 1980s and early-to-mid 1990s, although a small number of articles were published about them. People were still trying to figure out what to do with type-1 fuzzy sets, so even though Zadeh proposed type-2 fuzzy sets in 1976, the time was not right for researchers to drop what they were doing with type-1 fuzzy sets to focus on type-2 fuzzy sets. This changed in the latter part of the 1990s as a result of Jerry Mendel and his student's works on type-2 fuzzy sets and systems. Since then, more researchers around the world are writing articles about type-2 fuzzy sets and systems.

== Interval type-2 fuzzy sets ==
Interval type-2 fuzzy sets have received the most attention because the mathematics that is needed for such sets—primarily Interval arithmetic—is much simpler than the mathematics that is needed for general type-2 fuzzy sets. The literature about interval type-2 fuzzy sets is large, whereas the literature about general type-2 fuzzy sets is much smaller. Both kinds of fuzzy sets are being actively researched by an ever-growing number of researchers around the world and have resulted in successful employment in a variety of domains such as robot control.

Formally, the following have already been worked out for interval type-2 fuzzy sets:

- Fuzzy set operations: union, intersection and complement
- Centroid (a very widely used operation by practitioners of such sets, and also an important uncertainty measure for them)
- Other uncertainty measures [fuzziness, cardinality, variance and skewness and uncertainty bounds
- Similarity
- Subsethood
- Embedded fuzzy sets
- Fuzzy set ranking
- Fuzzy rule ranking and selection
- Type-reduction methods
- Firing intervals for an interval type-2 fuzzy logic system
- Fuzzy weighted average
- Linguistic weighted average
- Synthesizing an FOU from data that are collected from a group of subject

== Interval type-2 fuzzy logic systems ==
Type-2 fuzzy sets are finding very wide applicability in rule-based fuzzy logic systems (FLSs) because they let uncertainties be modeled by them whereas such uncertainties cannot be modeled by type-1 fuzzy sets. A block diagram of a type-2 FLS is depicted in Fig. 3. This kind of FLS is used in fuzzy logic control, fuzzy logic signal processing, rule-based classification, etc., and is sometimes referred to as a function approximation application of fuzzy sets, because the FLS is designed to minimize an error function.

Figure 3. Type-2 FLS.

The following discussions, about the four components in Fig. 3 rule-based FLS, are given for an interval type-2 FLS, because to-date they are the most popular kind of type-2 FLS; however, most of the discussions are also applicable for a general type-2 FLS.

Rules, that are either provided by subject experts or are extracted from numerical data, are expressed as a collection of IF-THEN statements, e.g.,

IF temperature is moderate and pressure is high, then rotate the valve a bit to the right.

Fuzzy sets are associated with the terms that appear in the antecedents (IF-part) or consequents (THEN-part) of rules, and with the inputs to and the outputs of the FLS. Membership functions are used to describe these fuzzy sets, and in a type-1 FLS they are all type-1 fuzzy sets, whereas in an interval type-2 FLS at least one membership function is an interval type-2 fuzzy set.

An interval type-2 FLS lets any one or all of the following kinds of uncertainties be quantified:

1. Words that are used in antecedents and consequents of rules—because words can mean different things to different people.
2. Uncertain consequents—because when rules are obtained from a group of experts, consequents will often be different for the same rule, i.e. the experts will not necessarily be in agreement.
3. Membership function parameters—because when those parameters are optimized using uncertain (noisy) training data, the parameters become uncertain.
4. Noisy measurements—because very often it is such measurements that activate the FLS.

In Fig. 3, measured (crisp) inputs are first transformed into fuzzy sets in the Fuzzifier block because it is fuzzy sets and not numbers that activate the rules which are described in terms of fuzzy sets and not numbers. Three kinds of fuzzifiers are possible in an interval type-2 FLS. When measurements are:

- Perfect, they are modeled as a crisp set;
- Noisy, but the noise is stationary, they are modeled as a type-1 fuzzy set; and,
- Noisy, but the noise is non-stationary, they are modeled as an interval type-2 fuzzy set (this latter kind of fuzzification cannot be done in a type-1 FLS).

In Fig. 3, after measurements are fuzzified, the resulting input fuzzy sets are mapped into fuzzy output sets by the Inference block. This is accomplished by first quantifying each rule using fuzzy set theory, and by then using the mathematics of fuzzy sets to establish the output of each rule, with the help of an inference mechanism. If there are M rules then the fuzzy input sets to the Inference block will activate only a subset of those rules, where the subset contains at least one rule and usually way fewer than M rules. The inference is done one rule at a time. So, at the output of the Inference block, there will be one or more fired-rule fuzzy output sets.

In most engineering applications of an FLS, a number (and not a fuzzy set) is needed as its final output, e.g., the consequent of the rule given above is "Rotate the valve a bit to the right." No automatic valve will know what this means because "a bit to the right" is a linguistic expression, and a valve must be turned by numerical values, i.e. by a certain number of degrees. Consequently, the fired-rule output fuzzy sets have to be converted into a number, and this is done in the Fig. 3 Output Processing block.

In a type-1 FLS, output processing, called "defuzzification", maps a type-1 fuzzy set into a number. There are many ways for doing this, e.g., compute the union of the fired-rule output fuzzy sets (the result is another type-1 fuzzy set) and then compute the center of gravity of the membership function for that set; compute a weighted average of the centers of gravity of each of the fired rule consequent membership functions; etc.

Things are somewhat more complicated for an interval type-2 FLS, because to go from an interval type-2 fuzzy set to a number (usually) requires two steps (Fig. 3). The first step, called "type-reduction", is where an interval type-2 fuzzy set is reduced to an interval-valued type-1 fuzzy set. There are as many type-reduction methods as there are type-1 defuzzification methods. An algorithm developed by Karnik and Mendel now known as the "KM algorithm" is used for type-reduction. Although this algorithm is iterative, it is very fast.

The second step of Output Processing, which occurs after type-reduction, is still called "defuzzification". Because a type-reduced set of an interval type-2 fuzzy set is always a finite interval of numbers, the defuzzified value is just the average of the two end-points of this interval.

It is clear from Fig. 3 that there can be two outputs to an interval type-2 FLS—crisp numerical values and the type-reduced set. The latter provides a measure of the uncertainties that have flowed through the interval type-2 FLS, due to the (possibly) uncertain input measurements that have activated rules whose antecedents or consequents or both are uncertain. Just as standard deviation is widely used in probability and statistics to provide a measure of unpredictable uncertainty about a mean value, the type-reduced set can provide a measure of uncertainty about the crisp output of an interval type-2 FLS.

== Computing with words ==
Another application for fuzzy sets has also been inspired by Zadeh — "Computing with Words". Different acronyms have been used for "computing with words," e.g., CW and CWW. According to Zadeh:

CWW is a methodology in which the objects of computation are words and propositions drawn from a natural language. [It is] inspired by the remarkable human capability to perform a wide variety of physical and mental tasks without any measurements and any computations.

Of course, he did not mean that computers would actually compute using words—single words or phrases—rather than numbers. He meant that computers would be activated by words, which would be converted into a mathematical representation using fuzzy sets and that these fuzzy sets would be mapped by a CWW engine into some other fuzzy set after which the latter would be converted back into a word. A natural question to ask is: Which kind of fuzzy set—type-1 or type-2—should be used as a model for a word? Mendel has argued, on the basis of Karl Popper's concept of "falsificationism", that using a type-1 fuzzy set as a model for a word is scientifically incorrect. An interval type-2 fuzzy set should be used as a (first-order uncertainty) model for a word. Much research is underway about CWW.

== Applications ==
Type-2 fuzzy sets were applied in the following areas:

- Image processing
- Video processing and computer vision
- Failure Mode And Effect Analysis
- Function approximation and estimation
- Control systems

== Software ==
Freeware MATLAB implementations, which cover general and interval type-2 fuzzy sets and systems, as well as type-1 fuzzy systems, are available at: http://sipi.usc.edu/~mendel/software.
Software supporting discrete interval type-2 fuzzy logic systems is available at:
DIT2FLS Toolbox - http://dit2fls.com/projects/dit2fls-toolbox/
DIT2FLS Library Package - http://dit2fls.com/projects/dit2fls-library-package/

Java libraries including source code for type-1, interval- and general type-2 fuzzy systems are available at: http://juzzy.wagnerweb.net/.

Python library for type 1 and type 2 fuzzy sets is available at: https://github.com/carmelgafa/type2fuzzy

Python library for interval type 2 fuzzy sets and systems is available at: https://github.com/Haghrah/PyIT2FLS

An open source Matlab/Simulink Toolbox for Interval Type-2 Fuzzy Logic Systems is available at: http://web.itu.edu.tr/kumbasart/type2fuzzy.htm

== See also ==
- Computational intelligence
- Expert system
- Fuzzy control system
- Fuzzy logic
- Fuzzy set
- Granular computing
- Perceptual Computing
- Rough set
- Soft set
- Vagueness
- Random-fuzzy variable
