= Fuzzy finite element =

The fuzzy finite element method combines the well-established finite element method with the concept of fuzzy numbers, the latter being a special case of a fuzzy set. The advantage of using fuzzy numbers instead of real numbers lies in the incorporation of uncertainty (on material properties, parameters, geometry, initial conditions, etc.) in the finite element analysis.

One way to establish a fuzzy finite element (FE) analysis is to use existing FE software (in-house or commercial) as an inner-level module to compute a deterministic result, and to add an outer-level loop to handle the fuzziness (uncertainty). This outer-level loop comes down to solving an optimization problem. If the inner-level deterministic module produces monotonic behavior with respect to the input variables, then the outer-level optimization problem is greatly simplified, since in this case the extrema will be located at the vertices of the domain.

== See also ==
- Finite element method
- Fuzzy number
- Fuzzy set
- Uncertainty
