= Neuro-fuzzy systems =

Approach to artificial intelligence

Sketch of a neuro-fuzzy system implementing a simple Sugeno-Takagi controller

In the field of artificial intelligence, the designation neuro-fuzzy refers to combinations of artificial neural networks and fuzzy logic.

== Overview ==
Neuro-fuzzy hybridization results in a hybrid intelligent system that combines the human-like reasoning style of fuzzy systems with the learning and connectionist structure of neural networks. Neuro-fuzzy hybridization is widely termed as fuzzy neural network (FNN) or neuro-fuzzy system (NFS) in the literature. Neuro-fuzzy system (the more popular term is used henceforth) incorporates the human-like reasoning style of fuzzy systems through the use of fuzzy sets and a linguistic model consisting of a set of IF-THEN fuzzy rules. The main strength of neuro-fuzzy systems is that they are universal approximators with the ability to solicit interpretable IF-THEN rules.

The strength of neuro-fuzzy systems involves two contradictory requirements in fuzzy modeling: interpretability versus accuracy. In practice, one of the two properties prevails. The neuro-fuzzy in fuzzy modeling research field is divided into two areas: linguistic fuzzy modeling that is focused on interpretability, mainly the Mamdani model; and precise fuzzy modeling that is focused on accuracy, mainly the Takagi-Sugeno-Kang (TSK) model.

Although generally assumed to be the realization of a fuzzy system through connectionist networks, this term is also used to describe some other configurations including:

- Deriving fuzzy rules from trained RBF networks.
- Fuzzy logic based tuning of neural network training parameters.
- Fuzzy logic criteria for increasing a network size.
- Realising fuzzy membership function through clustering algorithms in unsupervised learning in SOMs and neural networks.
- Representing fuzzification, fuzzy inference and defuzzification through multi-layers feed-forward connectionist networks.

It must be pointed out that interpretability of the Mamdani-type neuro-fuzzy systems can be lost. To improve the interpretability of neuro-fuzzy systems, certain measures must be taken, wherein important aspects of interpretability of neuro-fuzzy systems are also discussed.

A recent research line addresses the data stream mining case, where neuro-fuzzy systems are sequentially updated with new incoming samples on demand and on-the-fly. Thereby, system updates not only include a recursive adaptation of model parameters, but also a dynamic evolution and pruning of model components (neurons, rules), in order to handle concept drift and dynamically changing system behavior adequately and to keep the systems/models "up-to-date" anytime. Comprehensive surveys of various evolving neuro-fuzzy systems approaches can be found in and.

== Pseudo outer-product based fuzzy neural networks ==
Pseudo outer product-based fuzzy neural networks (POPFNN) are a family of neuro-fuzzy systems that are based on the linguistic fuzzy model.

Three members of POPFNN exist in the literature:

- POPFNN-AARS(S), which is based on the Approximate Analogical Reasoning Scheme
- POPFNN-CRI(S), which is based on commonly accepted fuzzy Compositional Rule of Inference
- POPFNN-TVR, which is based on Truth Value Restriction

The "POPFNN" architecture is a five-layer neural network where the layers from 1 to 5 are called: input linguistic layer, condition layer, rule layer, consequent layer, output linguistic layer. The fuzzification of the inputs and the defuzzification of the outputs are respectively performed by the input linguistic and output linguistic layers while the fuzzy inference is collectively performed by the rule, condition and consequence layers.

The learning process of POPFNN consists of three phases:

1. Fuzzy membership generation
2. Fuzzy rule identification
3. Supervised fine-tuning

Various fuzzy membership generation algorithms can be used: Learning Vector Quantization (LVQ), Fuzzy Kohonen Partitioning (FKP) or Discrete Incremental Clustering (DIC). Generally, the POP algorithm and its variant LazyPOP are used to identify the fuzzy rules.
