= Fuzzy mathematics =

Branch of mathematics

Fuzzy mathematics is a branch of mathematics that extends classical set theory and logic to model reasoning under uncertainty. Initiated by Lotfi Asker Zadeh in 1965 with the introduction of fuzzy sets, the field has since evolved to include fuzzy set theory, fuzzy logic, and various fuzzy analogues of traditional mathematic structures.

Unlike classical mathematics, which usually relies on binary membership (an element either belongs to a set or it does not), fuzzy mathematics allows elements to partially belong to a set, with degrees of membership represented by values in the interval [0, 1]. This framework enables more flexible modeling of imprecise or vague concepts.

Fuzzy mathematics has found applications in numerous domains, including control theory, artificial intelligence, decision theory, pattern recognition, and linguistics, where the modeling of gradations and uncertainty is essential.

== Definition ==
A fuzzy subset A of a set X is defined by a function A: X → L, where L is typically the interval [0, 1]. This function is called the membership function of the fuzzy subset and assigns to each element x in X a degree of membership A(x) in the fuzzy set A.

In classical set theory, a subset of X can be represented by an indicator function (also known as a characteristic function), which maps elements to either 0 or 1, indicating non-membership or full membership, respectively. Fuzzy subsets generalize this concept by allowing any real value between 0 and 1, thereby enabling partial membership.

More generally, the codomain L of the membership function can be replaced with any complete lattice, resulting in the broader framework of L-fuzzy sets.

== Fuzzification ==
The development of fuzzification in mathematics can be broadly divided into three historical stages:

1. Initial, straightforward fuzzifications (1960s–1970s),
2. Expansion of generalization techniques (1980s),
3. Standardization, axiomatization, and L-fuzzification (1990s).

Fuzzification generally involves extending classical mathematical concepts from binary (crisp) logic, where membership is determined by characteristic functions, to fuzzy logic, where membership is expressed by values in the interval [0, 1] via membership functions.

Let A and B be fuzzy subsets of a set X. The fuzzy versions of set-theoretic operations are commonly defined as:

$$(A \cap B)(x) = \min(A(x), B(x))$$
$$(A \cup B)(x) = \max(A(x), B(x))$$

for all $x \in X$. These operations can be generalized using t-norms and t-conorms, respectively. For example, the minimum operation can be replaced by multiplication:

$$(A \cap B)(x) = A(x) \cdot B(x)$$

Fuzzification of algebraic structures often relies on generalizing the closure property. Let $*$ be a binary operation on X, and let A be a fuzzy subset of X. Then A is said to satisfy fuzzy closure if:

$$A(x * y) \geq \min(A(x), A(y))$$
for all $x, y \in X$.

If $(G, *)$ is a group, then a fuzzy subset A of G is a fuzzy subgroup if:

$$A(x * y^{-1}) \geq \min(A(x), A(y^{-1}))$$
for all $x, y \in G$.

Similar generalizations apply to relational properties. For example, for example, for fuzzification of the transitivity property, a fuzzy relation $R$ on $X$ (i.e., a fuzzy subset of $X \times X$) is said to be fuzzy transitive if:

$$R(x, z) \geq \min(R(x, y), R(y, z))$$
for all $x, y, z \in X$.

== Fuzzy analogues ==
Fuzzy subgroupoids and fuzzy subgroups were introduced in 1971 by A. Rosenfeld.

Analogues of other mathematical subjects have been translated to fuzzy mathematics, such as fuzzy field theory and fuzzy Galois theory, fuzzy topology, fuzzy geometry, fuzzy orderings, and fuzzy graphs.

== See also ==
- Fuzzy measure theory
- Fuzzy subalgebra
- Monoidal t-norm logic
- Possibility theory
- T-norm
