= Didier Dubois =

Didier Dubois is the name of:

- Didier Dubois (mathematician) (born 1952), French mathematician
- Didier Dubois (athlete) (born 1957), French sprinter
- a fictitious character in Driv3r
