= Membership function (mathematics) =

Generalization of the indicator function for classical sets in fuzzy logic

In mathematics, the membership function of a fuzzy set is a generalization of the indicator function for classical sets. In fuzzy logic, it represents the degree of truth as an extension of valuation. Degrees of truth are often confused with probabilities, although they are conceptually distinct, because fuzzy truth represents membership in vaguely defined sets, not likelihood of some event or condition. Membership functions were introduced by Aliasker Zadeh in the first paper on fuzzy sets (1965). Aliasker Zadeh, in his theory of fuzzy sets, proposed using a membership function (with a range covering the interval (0,1)) operating on the domain of all possible values.

== Definition ==
For any set $X$, a membership function on $X$ is any function from $X$ to the real unit interval $[0,1]$.

Membership functions represent fuzzy subsets of $X$. The membership function which represents a fuzzy set $\tilde A$ is usually denoted by $\mu_A.$ For an element $x$ of $X$, the value $\mu_A(x)$ is called the membership degree of $x$ in the fuzzy set $\tilde A.$ The membership degree $\mu_{A}(x)$ quantifies the grade of membership of the element $x$ to the fuzzy set $\tilde A.$ The value 0 means that $x$ is not a member of the fuzzy set; the value 1 means that $x$ is fully a member of the fuzzy set. The values between 0 and 1 characterize fuzzy members, which belong to the fuzzy set only partially.

Membership function of a fuzzy set

Sometimes, a more general definition is used, where membership functions take values in an arbitrary fixed algebra or structure $L$; usually it is required that $L$ be at least a poset or lattice. The usual membership functions with values in [0, 1] are then called [0, 1]-valued membership functions.

== Capacity ==
One application of membership functions is as capacities in decision theory.

In decision theory, a capacity is defined as a function, $\nu$ from S, the set of subsets of some set, into $[0,1]$, such that $\nu$ is set-wise monotone and is normalized (i.e. $\nu(\empty) = 0, \nu(\Omega)=1).$ This is a generalization of the notion of a probability measure, where the probability axiom of countable additivity is weakened. A capacity is used as a subjective measure of the likelihood of an event, and the "expected value" of an outcome given a certain capacity can be found by taking the Choquet integral over the capacity.

== See also ==
- Defuzzification
- Fuzzy measure theory
- Fuzzy set operations
- Rough set

== Bibliography ==
- Zadeh L.A., 1965, "Fuzzy sets". Information and Control 8: 338–353.
- Goguen J.A, 1967, "L-fuzzy sets". Journal of Mathematical Analysis and Applications 18: 145–174
