= Set operation =

Set operation may have one of the following meanings.

- Any operation with sets
- Set operation (Boolean), Boolean set operations in the algebra of sets
- Set operations (SQL), type of operation in SQL
- Fuzzy set operations, a generalization of crisp sets for fuzzy sets

== See also ==
- Set (disambiguation)
- Set theory
