= George Klir =

Czech-American computer scientist

George J. Klir
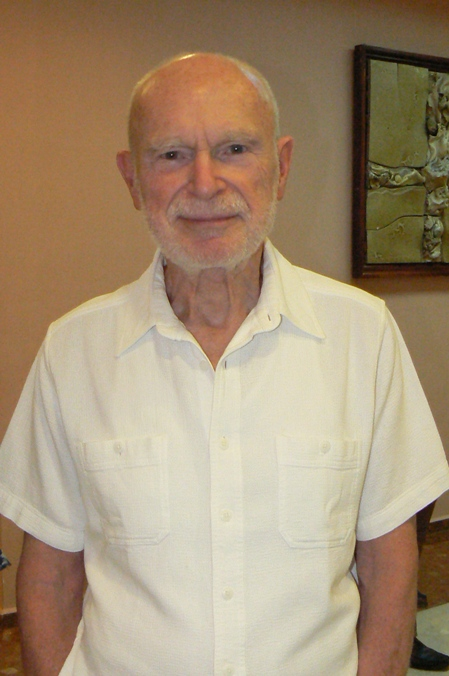
- Professor Klir on IEEE Conference "Intelligent Systems" '08, Varna, Bulgaria
- Born: April 22, 1932; Prague, Czechoslovakia
- Died: May 27, 2016 (aged 84); Vestal, New York, U.S.
- Education: Czech Technical University
- Known for: Fuzzy logic, general systems theory, generalized information theory, interval computations
- Scientific career
- Fields: Computer science, systems science
- Doctoral students: Cliff Joslyn; Luis M. Rocha

George Jiří Klir (April 22, 1932 – May 27, 2016) was a Czech-American computer scientist and professor of systems sciences at Binghamton University in Binghamton, New York.

== Biography ==
George Klir was born in 1932 in Prague, Czechoslovakia. In 1957 he received a M.S. degree in electrical engineering at the Czech Technical University in Prague. In the early 1960s he taught at the Institute of Computer Research in Prague. In 1964 he received a doctorate in computer science from the Czechoslovak Academy of Sciences.

In the 1960s Klir went to Iraq to teach at the Baghdad University for two years. At the end he managed to immigrate to the U.S. He started teaching computer science at UCLA and at the Fairleigh Dickinson University. In 1969 he came to Binghamton University, where he later became professor of systems science. One year (1982–1983) he stayed as a fellow in Dutch Netherlands Institute for Advanced Study in the Humanities and Social Sciences (NIAS), where he completed the manuscript of his book Architecture of Systems Problem Solving. In 2007 he retired after 37 years at the university.

From 1974 to 2014 Klir was editor of the International Journal of General Systems, and from 1985 to 2016 of the International Book Series on Systems Science and Systems Engineering. From 1980 to 1984 George Klir was the first president of the International Federation for Systems Research (IFSR). In the years 1981–1982 he was also president of Society for General Systems Research, now International Society for the Systems Sciences. He was further president of the North American Fuzzy Information Processing Society from 1988 to 1991 and the International Fuzzy Systems Association (IFSA) from 1993 to 1995.

Klir received numerous awards and honors, including 5 honorary doctoral degrees, the Gold Medal of Bernard Bolzano, Lotfi A. Zadeh Best Paper Award, the Kaufmann's Gold Medal, SUNY Chancellor's Award for Excellence in Research and IFSA Award for Outstanding Achievement. In 2007 he was awarded the Fuzzy Systems Pioneer Award of the IEEE Computational Intelligence Society (CIS).

== Work ==
Klir was known for path-breaking research over almost four decades. His earlier work was in the areas of systems modeling and simulation, logic design, computer architecture, and discrete mathematics. Later research, from 1990s onward, included the areas of intelligent systems, generalized information theory, fuzzy set theory and fuzzy logic, theory of generalized measures, and soft computing.

== See also ==
- Fuzzy measure theory
- Fuzzy logic
- Fuzzy subalgebra
- Genetic Fuzzy Systems
- International Federation for Systems Research

== Publications ==
Klir was the author of 23 books, over 300 articles, and he also edited 10 books:

Books (selection):

- 1967, Cybernetic Modelling, Iliffe, London.
- 1969, An Approach to General Systems Theory, Van Nostrand Reinhold, New York.
- 1972, Trends in General Systems Theory, (ed.) 462 pp.
- 1972, Introduction to the Methodology of Switching Circuits, 573 pp.
- 1979, Methodology in Systems Modelling and Simulation, with B. P. Zeigler, M. S. Elzas, and T. I. Oren (ed.), North-Holland, Amsterdam.
- 1978, Applied General Systems Research, (ed.), Plenum Press, New York.
- 1985, Architecture of Systems Problem Solving, with D. Elias, Plenum Press, New York, 354 pp.
- 1988, Fuzzy Sets, Uncertainty and Information, with T. Folger, Prentice Hall.
- 1991, Facets of Systems Science, Plenum Press, New York, 748 pp.
- 1992, Fuzzy Measure Theory, with Zhenyuan Wang, Plenum Press, New York, 1991.
- 1995, Fuzzy Sets and Fuzzy Logic: Theory and Applications, with Bo Yuan, Prentice Hall, 592 pp.
- 1996, Fuzzy Sets, Fuzzy Logic, and Fuzzy Systems, with Lotfi Asker Zadeh (author) & Bo Yuan (ed.), Selected Papers, 840 pp.
- 1997, Fuzzy Set Theory: Foundations and Applications, with U. St. Clair and B. Yuan, Prentice Hall, 257 pp.
- 1998, Uncertainty-Based Information: Elements of Generalized Information Theory, with M. Wierman, Springer Verlag, Heidelberg.
- 2000, Fuzzy Sets: An Overview of Fundamentals and Personal Views, Beijing Normal University Press, Beijing.
- 2005, Uncertainty and Information: Foundations of Generalized Information Theory, John Wiley, Hoboken, NJ, 499 pp.
- 2009, Generalized Measure Theory, with W. Zhenyuan, Springer Verlag, New York.
- 2011, Concepts and Fuzzy Logic, with Radim Belohlavek, MIT Press, 2011.
- 2017, Fuzzy Logic and Mathematics: A Historical Perspective, with Radim Belohlavek and Joseph W. Dauben, Oxford Univ. Press, 2017.
