= Fuzzy Sets and Systems =

- Discipline: Computer science, mathematics
- Language: English
- Edited by: B. de Baets, D. Dubois, E. Hüllermeier

Publication details
- History: 1978–present
- Publisher: Elsevier (the Netherlands)
- Frequency: 24/year
- Impact factor: 3.343 (2020)

Standard abbreviations
- ISO 4: Fuzzy Sets Syst.
- MathSciNet: Fuzzy Sets and Systems

Indexing
- ISSN: 0165-0114

Links
- Journal homepage; Online access

Fuzzy Sets and Systems is a peer-reviewed international scientific journal published by Elsevier on behalf of the International Fuzzy Systems Association (IFSA) and was founded in 1978. The editors-in-chief (as of 2010) are Bernard De Baets of the Department of Data Analysis and Mathematical Modelling (at Ghent University in Belgium), Didier Dubois (of IRIT, Université Paul Sabatier in Toulouse, France) and Eyke Hüllermeier (of the Department of Mathematics, Statistics and Computer Science, Ludwig-Maximilians-Universität München (LMU), Germany). The journal publishes 24 issues a year. Fuzzy Sets and Systems is abstracted and indexed by Scopus and the Science Citation Index. According to the Journal Citation Reports released in 2010, its 2-year impact factor calculated for 2020 is 3.343 and its 5-year impact factor for 2020 is 3.213.

== See also ==
- Fuzzy control system
- Fuzzy Control Language
- Fuzzy logic
- Fuzzy set
