= Fuzzy number =

Real numbers with a multi-valued logical classification

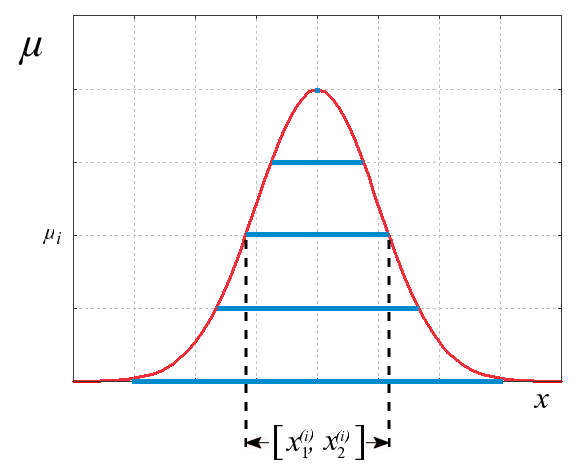
Fuzzy arithmetic

A fuzzy number is a generalization of a regular real number in the sense that it does not refer to one single value but rather to a connected set of possible values, where each possible value has its own weight between 0 and 1. This weight is called the membership function. A fuzzy number is thus a special case of a convex, normalized fuzzy set of the real line. Just like fuzzy logic is an extension of Boolean logic (which uses absolute truth and falsehood only, and nothing in between), fuzzy numbers are an extension of real numbers. Calculations with fuzzy numbers allow the incorporation of uncertainty on parameters, properties, geometry, initial conditions, etc. The arithmetic calculations on fuzzy numbers are implemented using fuzzy arithmetic operations, which can be done by two different approaches: (1) interval arithmetic approach; and (2) the extension principle approach.

A fuzzy number is equal to a fuzzy interval. The degree of fuzziness is determined by the a-cut which is also called the fuzzy spread.

== See also ==
- Fuzzy set
- Uncertainty
- Interval arithmetic
- Random variable
