= Connectionist expert system =

Artificial neural network-based expert systems

Connectionist expert systems are artificial neural network (ANN) based expert systems where the ANN generates inferencing rules e.g., fuzzy-multi layer perceptron where linguistic and natural form of inputs are used. Apart from that, rough set theory may be used for encoding knowledge in the weights better and also genetic algorithms may be used to optimize the search solutions better. Symbolic reasoning methods may also be incorporated (see hybrid intelligent system). (Also see expert system, neural network, clinical decision support system.)
