= Didier Dubois (mathematician) =

French mathematician

Didier Dubois (born 1952) is a French mathematician. Since 1999, he is a co-editor-in-chief of the journal Fuzzy Sets and Systems. In 1993–1997 he was vice-president and president of the International Fuzzy Systems Association. His research interests include fuzzy set theory, possibility theory, and knowledge representation. Most of his works are co-authored by Henri Prade.

== Selected bibliography ==
- Dubois, Didier and Prade, Henri (1980). Fuzzy Sets & Systems: Theory and Applications. Academic Press (APNet). ISBN 0-122-22750-6
- Dubois, Didier and Prade, Henri (1988). Possibility Theory: An Approach to Computerized Processing of Uncertainty. New York: Plenum Press.

== See also ==
- Construction of t-norms for Dubois–Prade t-norms
