= Soft set =

Mathematical theory

Soft set theory is a generalization of fuzzy set theory, that was proposed by Molodtsov in 1999 to deal with uncertainty in a parametric manner. A soft set is a parameterised family of sets - intuitively, this is "soft" because the boundary of the set depends on the parameters. Formally, a soft set, over a universal set X and set of parameters E is a pair (f, A) where A is a subset of E, and f is a function from A to the power set of X. For each e in A, the set f(e) is called the value set of e in (f, A).

A systematic literature review on soft set theory was published in the journal Neural Computing and Applications in February 2024.

One of the most important steps for the new theory of soft sets was to define mappings on soft sets, which was achieved in 2009 by the mathematicians Athar Kharal and Bashir Ahmad, with the results published in 2011. Soft sets have also been applied to the problem of medical diagnosis for use in medical expert systems. Fuzzy soft sets and N-soft sets have also been introduced. Mappings on fuzzy soft sets were defined and studied by Kharal and Ahmad.

This article references a source that one of the article's contributors may have written or published. Citing oneself is allowed on Wikipedia, but may represent a conflict of interest. Contributors should be careful not to place undue weight on their own work, and are discouraged from excessive self-citation. Guidelines relevant to this situation include Wikipedia:Conflict of interest, Wikipedia:Neutral point of view and WP:SELFPUBLISHED.
- [[User:{{{1}}}|{{{1}}}]] ([[User talk:{{{1}}}|talk]] · [[Special:Contribs/{{{1}}}|contribs]]) — {{{2}}}
