= Construction of t-norms =

Mathematics

In mathematics, t-norms are a special kind of binary operations on the real unit interval [0, 1]. Various constructions of t-norms, either by explicit definition or by transformation from previously known functions, provide a plenitude of examples and classes of t-norms. This is important, e.g., for finding counter-examples or supplying t-norms with particular properties for use in engineering applications of fuzzy logic. The main ways of construction of t-norms include using generators, defining parametric classes of t-norms, rotations, or ordinal sums of t-norms.

Relevant background can be found in the article on t-norms.

== Generators of t-norms ==
The method of constructing t-norms by generators consists in using a unary function (generator) to transform some known binary function (most often, addition or multiplication) into a t-norm.

In order to allow using non-bijective generators, which do not have the inverse function, the following notion of pseudo-inverse function is employed:

Let f: [a, b] → [c, d] be a monotone function between two closed subintervals of extended real line. The pseudo-inverse function to f is the function f ^{(−1)}: [c, d] → [a, b] defined as

$$f^{(-1)}(y) = \begin{cases}
\sup \{ x\in[a,b] \mid f(x) < y \} & \text{for } f \text{ non-decreasing} \\
\sup \{ x\in[a,b] \mid f(x) > y \} & \text{for } f \text{ non-increasing.}
\end{cases}$$

=== Additive generators ===
The construction of t-norms by additive generators is based on the following theorem:

Let f: [0, 1] → [0, +∞] be a strictly decreasing function such that f(1) = 0 and f(x) + f(y) is in the range of f or in [f(0^{+}), +∞] for all x, y in [0, 1]. Then the function T: [0, 1]^{2} → [0, 1] defined as

T(x, y) = f ^{(-1)}(f(x) + f(y))

is a t-norm.

Alternatively, one may avoid using the notion of pseudo-inverse function by having $T(x,y)=f^{-1}\left(\min\left(f(0^+),f(x)+f(y)\right)\right)$. The corresponding residuum can then be expressed as $(x \Rightarrow y) = f^{-1}\left(\max\left(0,f(y)-f(x)\right)\right)$. And the biresiduum as $(x \Leftrightarrow y) = f^{-1}\left(\left|f(x)-f(y)\right|\right)$.

If a t-norm T results from the latter construction by a function f which is right-continuous in 0, then f is called an additive generator of T.

Examples:

- The function f(x) = 1 – x for x in [0, 1] is an additive generator of the Łukasiewicz t-norm.
- The function f defined as f(x) = –log(x) if 0 < x ≤ 1 and f(0) = +∞ is an additive generator of the product t-norm.
- The function f defined as f(x) = 2 – x if 0 ≤ x < 1 and f(1) = 0 is an additive generator of the drastic t-norm.

Basic properties of additive generators are summarized by the following theorem:

Let f: [0, 1] → [0, +∞] be an additive generator of a t-norm T. Then:
- T is an Archimedean t-norm.
- T is continuous if and only if f is continuous.
- T is strictly monotone if and only if f(0) = +∞.
- Each element of (0, 1) is a nilpotent element of T if and only if f(0) < +∞.
- The multiple of f by a positive constant is also an additive generator of T.
- T has no non-trivial idempotents. (Consequently, e.g., the minimum t-norm has no additive generator.)

=== Multiplicative generators ===
The isomorphism between addition on [0, +∞] and multiplication on [0, 1] by the logarithm and the exponential function allow two-way transformations between additive and multiplicative generators of a t-norm. If f is an additive generator of a t-norm T, then the function h: [0, 1] → [0, 1] defined as h(x) = e^{−f (x)} is a multiplicative generator of T, that is, a function h such that

- h is strictly increasing
- h(1) = 1
- h(x) · h(y) is in the range of h or equal to 0 or h(0+) for all x, y in [0, 1]
- h is right-continuous in 0
- T(x, y) = h ^{(−1)}(h(x) · h(y)).

Vice versa, if h is a multiplicative generator of T, then f: [0, 1] → [0, +∞] defined by f(x) = −log(h(x)) is an additive generator of T.

== Parametric classes of t-norms ==
Many families of related t-norms can be defined by an explicit formula depending on a parameter p. This section lists the best known parameterized families of t-norms. The following definitions will be used in the list:

- A family of t-norms T_{p} parameterized by p is increasing if T_{p}(x, y) ≤ T_{q}(x, y) for all x, y in [0, 1] whenever p ≤ q (similarly for decreasing and strictly increasing or decreasing).
- A family of t-norms T_{p} is continuous with respect to the parameter p if

$$\lim_{p\to p_0} T_p = T_{p_0}$$

for all values p_{0} of the parameter.

=== Schweizer–Sklar t-norms ===
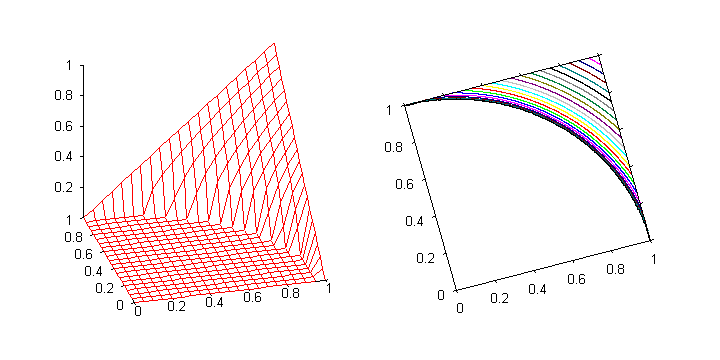
Graph (3D and contours) of the Schweizer–Sklar t-norm with p = 2

The family of Schweizer–Sklar t-norms, introduced by Berthold Schweizer and Abe Sklar in the early 1960s, is given by the parametric definition

$$T^{\mathrm{SS}}_p(x,y) = \begin{cases}
T_{\min}(x,y)          & \text{if } p = -\infty \\
(x^p + y^p - 1)^{1/p}          & \text{if } -\infty < p < 0 \\
T_{\mathrm{prod}}(x,y)         & \text{if } p = 0 \\
(\max(0, x^p + y^p - 1))^{1/p} & \text{if } 0 < p < +\infty \\
T_{\mathrm{D}}(x,y)            & \text{if } p = +\infty.
\end{cases}$$

A Schweizer–Sklar t-norm $T^{\mathrm{SS}}_p$ is

- Archimedean if and only if p > −∞
- Continuous if and only if p < +∞
- Strict if and only if −∞ < p ≤ 0 (for p = −1 it is the Hamacher product)
- Nilpotent if and only if 0 < p < +∞ (for p = 1 it is the Łukasiewicz t-norm).

The family is strictly decreasing for p ≥ 0 and continuous with respect to p in [−∞, +∞]. An additive generator for $T^{\mathrm{SS}}_p$ for −∞ < p < +∞ is

$$f^{\mathrm{SS}}_p (x) = \begin{cases}
-\log x           & \text{if } p = 0 \\
\frac{1 - x^p}{p} & \text{otherwise.}
\end{cases}$$

=== Hamacher t-norms ===
The family of Hamacher t-norms, introduced by Horst Hamacher in the late 1970s, is given by the following parametric definition for 0 ≤ p ≤ +∞:

$$T^{\mathrm{H}}_p (x,y) = \begin{cases}
T_{\mathrm{D}}(x,y)                & \text{if } p = +\infty \\
0                                  & \text{if } p = x = y = 0 \\
\frac{xy}{p + (1 - p)(x + y - xy)} & \text{otherwise.}
\end{cases}$$

The t-norm $T^{\mathrm{H}}_0$ is called the Hamacher product.

Hamacher t-norms are the only t-norms which are rational functions. The Hamacher t-norm $T^{\mathrm{H}}_p$ is strict if and only if p < +∞ (for p = 1 it is the product t-norm). The family is strictly decreasing and continuous with respect to p. An additive generator of $T^{\mathrm{H}}_p$ for p < +∞ is

$$f^{\mathrm{H}}_p(x) = \begin{cases}
\frac{1 - x}{x}            & \text{if } p = 0 \\
\log\frac{p + (1 - p)x}{x} & \text{otherwise.}
\end{cases}$$

=== Frank t-norms ===
The family of Frank t-norms, introduced by M.J. Frank in the late 1970s, is given by the parametric definition for 0 ≤ p ≤ +∞ as follows:

$$T^{\mathrm{F}}_p(x,y) = \begin{cases}
T_{\mathrm{min}}(x,y)  & \text{if } p = 0 \\
T_{\mathrm{prod}}(x,y) & \text{if } p = 1 \\
T_{\mathrm{Luk}}(x,y)  & \text{if } p = +\infty \\
\log_p\left(1 + \frac{(p^x - 1)(p^y - 1)}{p - 1}\right) & \text{otherwise.}
\end{cases}$$

The Frank t-norm $T^{\mathrm{F}}_p$ is strict if p < +∞. The family is strictly decreasing and continuous with respect to p. An additive generator for $T^{\mathrm{F}}_p$ is

$$f^{\mathrm{F}}_p(x) = \begin{cases}
-\log x                   & \text{if } p = 1 \\
1 - x                     & \text{if } p = +\infty \\
\log\frac{p - 1}{p^x - 1} & \text{otherwise.}
\end{cases}$$

=== Yager t-norms ===
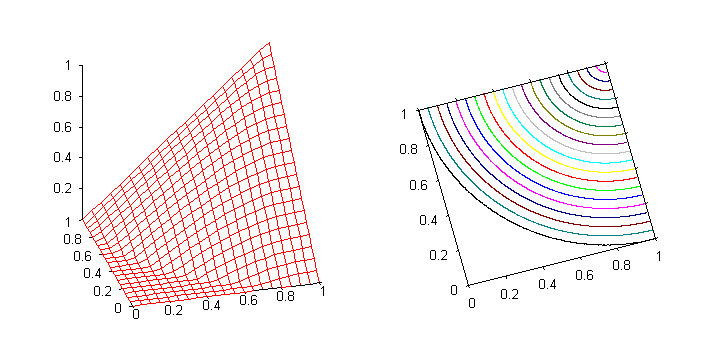
Graph of the Yager t-norm with p = 2

The family of Yager t-norms, introduced in the early 1980s by Ronald R. Yager, is given for 0 ≤ p ≤ +∞ by

$$T^{\mathrm{Y}}_p (x,y) = \begin{cases}
T_{\mathrm{D}}(x,y)   & \text{if } p = 0 \\
\max\left(0, 1 - ((1 - x)^p + (1 - y)^p)^{1/p}\right) & \text{if } 0 < p < +\infty \\
T_{\mathrm{min}}(x,y) & \text{if } p = +\infty
\end{cases}$$

The Yager t-norm $T^{\mathrm{Y}}_p$ is nilpotent if and only if 0 < p < +∞ (for p = 1 it is the Łukasiewicz t-norm). The family is strictly increasing and continuous with respect to p. The Yager t-norm $T^{\mathrm{Y}}_p$ for 0 < p < +∞ arises from the Łukasiewicz t-norm by raising its additive generator to the power of p. An additive generator of $T^{\mathrm{Y}}_p$ for 0 < p < +∞ is

$$f^{\mathrm{Y}}_p(x) = (1 - x)^p.$$

=== Aczél–Alsina t-norms ===
The family of Aczél–Alsina t-norms, introduced in the early 1980s by János Aczél and Claudi Alsina, is given for 0 ≤ p ≤ +∞ by

$$T^{\mathrm{AA}}_p (x,y) = \begin{cases}
T_{\mathrm{D}}(x,y)   & \text{if } p = 0 \\
e^{-\left(|-\log x|^p + |-\log y|^p\right)^{1/p}} & \text{if } 0 < p < +\infty \\
T_{\mathrm{min}}(x,y) & \text{if } p = +\infty
\end{cases}$$

The Aczél–Alsina t-norm $T^{\mathrm{AA}}_p$ is strict if and only if 0 < p < +∞ (for p = 1 it is the product t-norm). The family is strictly increasing and continuous with respect to p. The Aczél–Alsina t-norm $T^{\mathrm{AA}}_p$ for 0 < p < +∞ arises from the product t-norm by raising its additive generator to the power of p. An additive generator of $T^{\mathrm{AA}}_p$ for 0 < p < +∞ is

$$f^{\mathrm{AA}}_p(x) = (-\log x)^p.$$

=== Dombi t-norms ===
The family of Dombi t-norms, introduced by József Dombi (1982), is given for 0 ≤ p ≤ +∞ by

$$T^{\mathrm{D}}_p (x,y) = \begin{cases}
0                     & \text{if } x = 0 \text{ or } y = 0 \\
T_{\mathrm{D}}(x,y)   & \text{if } p = 0 \\
T_{\mathrm{min}}(x,y) & \text{if } p = +\infty \\
\frac{1}{1 + \left(
\left(\frac{1 - x}{x}\right)^p + \left(\frac{1 - y}{y}\right)^p
\right)^{1/p}} & \text{otherwise.} \\
\end{cases}$$

The Dombi t-norm $T^{\mathrm{D}}_p$ is strict if and only if 0 < p < +∞ (for p = 1 it is the Hamacher product). The family is strictly increasing and continuous with respect to p. The Dombi t-norm $T^{\mathrm{D}}_p$ for 0 < p < +∞ arises from the Hamacher product t-norm by raising its additive generator to the power of p. An additive generator of $T^{\mathrm{D}}_p$ for 0 < p < +∞ is

$$f^{\mathrm{D}}_p(x) = \left(\frac{1-x}{x}\right)^p.$$

=== Sugeno–Weber t-norms ===
The family of Sugeno–Weber t-norms was introduced in the early 1980s by Siegfried Weber; the dual t-conorms were defined already in the early 1970s by Michio Sugeno. It is given for −1 ≤ p ≤ +∞ by

$$T^{\mathrm{SW}}_p (x,y) = \begin{cases}
T_{\mathrm{D}}(x,y)    & \text{if } p = -1 \\
\max\left(0, \frac{x + y - 1 + pxy}{1 + p}\right) & \text{if } -1 < p < +\infty \\
T_{\mathrm{prod}}(x,y) & \text{if } p = +\infty
\end{cases}$$

The Sugeno–Weber t-norm $T^{\mathrm{SW}}_p$ is nilpotent if and only if −1 < p < +∞ (for p = 0 it is the Łukasiewicz t-norm). The family is strictly increasing and continuous with respect to p. An additive generator of $T^{\mathrm{SW}}_p$ for 0 < p < +∞ [sic] is

$$f^{\mathrm{SW}}_p(x) = \begin{cases}
1 - x   & \text{if } p = 0 \\
1 - \log_{1 + p}(1 + px) & \text{otherwise.}
\end{cases}$$

== Ordinal sums ==
The ordinal sum constructs a t-norm from a family of t-norms, by shrinking them into disjoint subintervals of the interval [0, 1] and completing the t-norm by using the minimum on the rest of the unit square. It is based on the following theorem:

Let T_{i} for i in an index set I be a family of t-norms and (a_{i}, b_{i}) a family of pairwise disjoint (non-empty) open subintervals of [0, 1]. Then the function T: [0, 1]^{2} → [0, 1] defined as

$$T(x, y) = \begin{cases}
a_i + (b_i - a_i) \cdot T_i\left(\frac{x - a_i}{b_i - a_i}, \frac{y - a_i}{b_i - a_i}\right)
& \text{if } x, y \in [a_i, b_i]^2 \\
\min(x, y) & \text{otherwise}
\end{cases}$$

is a t-norm.

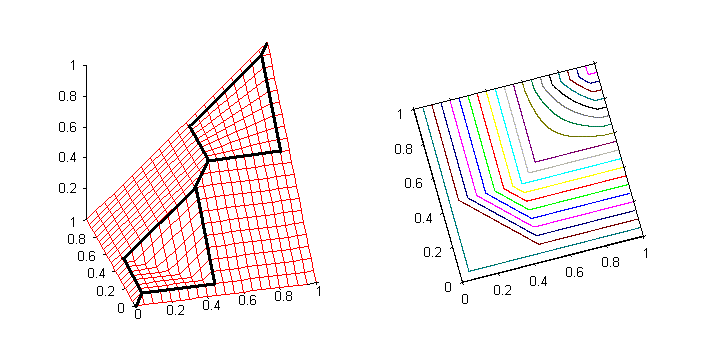
Ordinal sum of the Łukasiewicz t-norm on the interval [0.05, 0.45] and the product t-norm on the interval [0.55, 0.95]

The resulting t-norm is called the ordinal sum of the summands (T_{i}, a_{i}, b_{i}) for i in I, denoted by

$$T = \bigoplus\nolimits_{i\in I} (T_i, a_i, b_i),$$

or $(T_1, a_1, b_1) \oplus \dots \oplus (T_n, a_n, b_n)$ if I is finite.

Ordinal sums of t-norms enjoy the following properties:

- Each t-norm is a trivial ordinal sum of itself on the whole interval [0, 1].
- The empty ordinal sum (for the empty index set) yields the minimum t-norm T_{min}. Summands with the minimum t-norm can arbitrarily be added or omitted without changing the resulting t-norm.
- It can be assumed without loss of generality that the index set is countable, since the real line can only contain at most countably many disjoint subintervals.
- An ordinal sum of t-norm is continuous if and only if each summand is a continuous t-norm. (Analogously for left-continuity.)
- An ordinal sum is Archimedean if and only if it is a trivial sum of one Archimedean t-norm on the whole unit interval.
- An ordinal sum has zero divisors if and only if for some index i, a_{i} = 0 and T_{i} has zero divisors. (Analogously for nilpotent elements.)

If $T = \bigoplus\nolimits_{i\in I} (T_i, a_i, b_i)$ is a left-continuous t-norm, then its residuum R is given as follows:

$$R(x, y) = \begin{cases}
1 & \text{if } x \le y \\
a_i + (b_i - a_i) \cdot R_i\left(\frac{x - a_i}{b_i - a_i}, \frac{y - a_i}{b_i - a_i}\right)
& \text{if } a_i < y < x \le b_i \\
y & \text{otherwise.}
\end{cases}$$

where R_{i} is the residuum of T_{i}, for each i in I.

=== Ordinal sums of continuous t-norms ===
The ordinal sum of a family of continuous t-norms is a continuous t-norm. By the Mostert–Shields theorem, every continuous t-norm is expressible as the ordinal sum of Archimedean continuous t-norms. Since the latter are either nilpotent (and then isomorphic to the Łukasiewicz t-norm) or strict (then isomorphic to the product t-norm), each continuous t-norm is isomorphic to the ordinal sum of Łukasiewicz and product t-norms.

Important examples of ordinal sums of continuous t-norms are the following ones:

- Dubois–Prade t-norms, introduced by Didier Dubois and Henri Prade in the early 1980s, are the ordinal sums of the product t-norm on [0, p] for a parameter p in [0, 1] and the (default) minimum t-norm on the rest of the unit interval. The family of Dubois–Prade t-norms is decreasing and continuous with respect to p..
- Mayor–Torrens t-norms, introduced by Gaspar Mayor and Joan Torrens in the early 1990s, are the ordinal sums of the Łukasiewicz t-norm on [0, p] for a parameter p in [0, 1] and the (default) minimum t-norm on the rest of the unit interval. The family of Mayor–Torrens t-norms is decreasing and continuous with respect to p..

== Rotations ==
The construction of t-norms by rotation was introduced by Sándor Jenei (2000). It is based on the following theorem:

Let T be a left-continuous t-norm without zero divisors, N: [0, 1] → [0, 1] the function that assigns 1 − x to x and t = 0.5. Let T_{1} be the linear transformation of T into [t, 1] and $R_{T_1}(x,y) = \sup\{z \mid T_1(z,x)\le y\}.$ Then the function

$$T_{\mathrm{rot}} = \begin{cases}
T_1(x, y) & \text{if } x, y \in (t, 1] \\
N(R_{T_1}(x, N(y))) & \text{if } x \in (t, 1] \text{ and } y \in [0, t] \\
N(R_{T_1}(y, N(x))) & \text{if } x \in [0, t] \text{ and } y \in (t, 1] \\
0 & \text{if } x, y \in [0, t]
\end{cases}$$

is a left-continuous t-norm, called the rotation of the t-norm T.

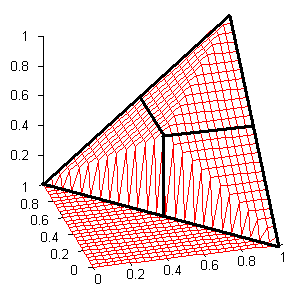
The nilpotent minimum as a rotation of the minimum t-norm

Geometrically, the construction can be described as first shrinking the t-norm T to the interval [0.5, 1] and then rotating it by the angle 2π/3 in both directions around the line connecting the points (0, 0, 1) and (1, 1, 0).

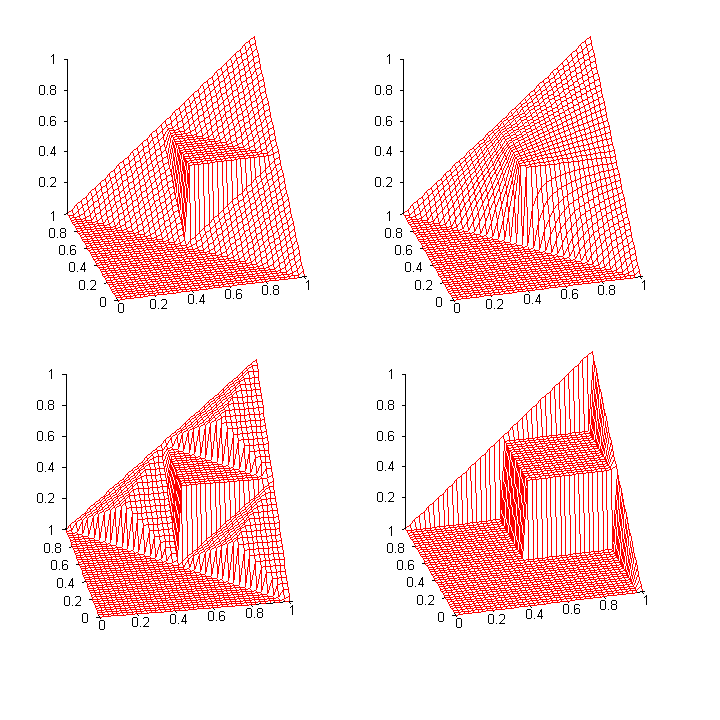
Rotations of the Łukasiewicz, product, nilpotent minimum, and drastic t-norm

The theorem can be generalized by taking for N any strong negation, that is, an involutive strictly decreasing continuous function on [0, 1], and for t taking the unique fixed point of N.

The resulting t-norm enjoys the following rotation invariance property with respect to N:

T(x, y) ≤ z if and only if T(y, N(z)) ≤ N(x) for all x, y, z in [0, 1].

The negation induced by T_{rot} is the function N, that is, N(x) = R_{rot}(x, 0) for all x, where R_{rot} is the residuum of T_{rot}.

== See also ==
- T-norm
- T-norm fuzzy logics
