= New Mathematics and Natural Computation =

- Discipline: Mathematics, Computer Science
- Language: English
- Edited by: Paul P. Wang

Publication details
- History: 2005-present
- Publisher: World Scientific (Singapore)

Standard abbreviations
- ISO 4: New Math. Nat. Comput.

Indexing
- ISSN: 1793-0057 (print); 1793-7027 (web)

Links
- Journal homepage

New Mathematics and Natural Computation is an interdisciplinary journal founded in 2005 and is now published by World Scientific. It covers mathematical uncertainty and its applications to computational, biological and social sciences, with a specific focus on relatively unexplored areas in mathematical uncertainty, such as fuzzy sets and fuzzy logic.

== Abstracting and indexing ==
The journal is abstracted and indexed in:

- Mathematical Reviews
- Zentralblatt MATH

As of 2013, it had a SCImago Journal Rank in the bottom quartile of journals in applied and computational mathematics, computer science applications, and human-computer interaction.
