= Fuzzy set operations =

Operations on fuzzy sets

Fuzzy set operations are a generalization of crisp set operations for fuzzy sets. There is in fact more than one possible generalization. The most widely used operations are called standard fuzzy set operations; they comprise: fuzzy complements, fuzzy intersections, and fuzzy unions.

== Standard fuzzy set operations ==
Let A and B be fuzzy sets that A,B ⊆ U, u is any element (e.g. value) in the U universe: u ∈ U.

Standard complement
$$\mu_{\lnot{A}}(u) = 1 - \mu_A(u)$$

The complement is sometimes denoted by ∁A or A^{∁} instead of ¬A.

Standard intersection
$$\mu_{A \cap B}(u) = \min\{\mu_A(u), \mu_B(u)\}$$

Standard union
$$\mu_{A \cup B}(u) = \max\{\mu_A(u), \mu_B(u)\}$$

In general, the triple (i,u,n) is called De Morgan Triplet iff

- i is a t-norm,
- u is a t-conorm (a.k.a. s-norm),
- n is a strong negator,

so that for all x,y ∈ [0, 1] the following holds true:

u(x,y) = n( i( n(x), n(y) ) )

(generalized De Morgan relation). This implies the axioms provided below in detail.

== Fuzzy complements ==
μ_{A}(x) is defined as the degree to which x belongs to A. Let ∁A denote a fuzzy complement of A of type c. Then μ_{∁A}(x) is the degree to which x belongs to ∁A, and the degree to which x does not belong to A. (μ_{A}(x) is therefore the degree to which x does not belong to ∁A.) Let a complement ∁A be defined by a function

c : [0,1] → [0,1]

For all x ∈ U: μ_{∁A}(x) = c(μ_{A}(x))

=== Axioms for fuzzy complements ===
Axiom c1. Boundary condition
c(0) = 1 and c(1) = 0

Axiom c2. Monotonicity
For all a, b ∈ [0, 1], if a < b, then c(a) > c(b)

Axiom c3. Continuity
c is continuous function.

Axiom c4. Involutions
c is an involution, which means that c(c(a)) = a for each a ∈ [0,1]

c is a strong negator (a.k.a. fuzzy complement).

A function c satisfying axioms c1 and c3 has at least one fixpoint a^{*} with c(a^{*}) = a^{*}, and if axiom c2 is fulfilled as well there is exactly one such fixpoint. For the standard negator c(x) = 1-x the unique fixpoint is a^{*} = 0.5 .

== Fuzzy intersections ==
The intersection of two fuzzy sets A and B is specified in general by a binary operation on the unit interval, a function of the form

i:[0,1]×[0,1] → [0,1].

For all x ∈ U: μ_{A ∩ B}(x) = i[μ_{A}(x), μ_{B}(x)].

=== Axioms for fuzzy intersection ===
Axiom i1. Boundary condition
i(a, 1) = a

Axiom i2. Monotonicity
b ≤ d implies i(a, b) ≤ i(a, d)

Axiom i3. Commutativity
i(a, b) = i(b, a)

Axiom i4. Associativity
i(a, i(b, d)) = i(i(a, b), d)

Axiom i5. Continuity
i is a continuous function

Axiom i6. Subidempotency
i(a, a) < a for all 0 < a < 1

Axiom i7. Strict monotonicity
i (a_{1}, b_{1}) < i (a_{2}, b_{2}) if a_{1} < a_{2} and b_{1} < b_{2}

Axioms i1 up to i4 define a t-norm (a.k.a. fuzzy intersection). The standard t-norm min is the only idempotent t-norm (that is, i (a_{1}, a_{1}) = a for all a ∈ [0,1]).

== Fuzzy unions ==
The union of two fuzzy sets A and B is specified in general by a binary operation on the unit interval function of the form

u:[0,1]×[0,1] → [0,1].

For all x ∈ U: μ_{A ∪ B}(x) = u[μ_{A}(x), μ_{B}(x)].

=== Axioms for fuzzy union ===
Axiom u1. Boundary condition
u(a, 0) =u(0 ,a) = a

Axiom u2. Monotonicity
b ≤ d implies u(a, b) ≤ u(a, d)

Axiom u3. Commutativity
u(a, b) = u(b, a)

Axiom u4. Associativity
u(a, u(b, d)) = u(u(a, b), d)

Axiom u5. Continuity
u is a continuous function

Axiom u6. Superidempotency
u(a, a) > a for all 0 < a < 1

Axiom u7. Strict monotonicity
a_{1} < a_{2} and b_{1} < b_{2} implies u(a_{1}, b_{1}) < u(a_{2}, b_{2})

Axioms u1 up to u4 define a t-conorm (a.k.a. s-norm or fuzzy union). The standard t-conorm max is the only idempotent t-conorm (i. e. u (a1, a1) = a for all a ∈ [0,1]).

== Aggregation operations ==
Aggregation operations on fuzzy sets are operations by which several fuzzy sets are combined in a desirable way to produce a single fuzzy set.

Aggregation operation on n fuzzy set (2 ≤ n) is defined by a function

h:[0,1]^{n} → [0,1]

=== Axioms for aggregation operations fuzzy sets ===
Axiom h1. Boundary condition
h(0, 0, ..., 0) = 0 and h(1, 1, ..., 1) = one

Axiom h2. Monotonicity
For any pair <a_{1}, a_{2}, ..., a_{n}> and <b_{1}, b_{2}, ..., b_{n}> of n-tuples such that a_{i}, b_{i} ∈ [0,1] for all i ∈ N_{n}, if a_{i} ≤ b_{i} for all i ∈ N_{n}, then h(a_{1}, a_{2}, ...,a_{n}) ≤ h(b_{1}, b_{2}, ..., b_{n}); that is, h is monotonic increasing in all its arguments.

Axiom h3. Continuity
h is a continuous function.

== See also ==
- Fuzzy logic
- Fuzzy set
- T-norm
- Type-2 fuzzy sets and systems
- De Morgan algebra
