= Defuzzification =

Process mapping a fuzzy set to a crisp set

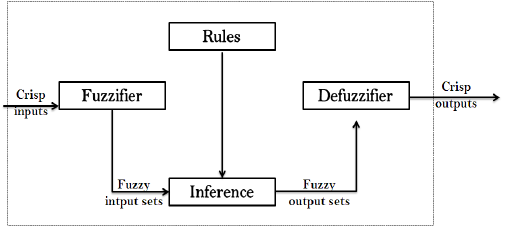
The place of defuzzification in a fuzzy control system

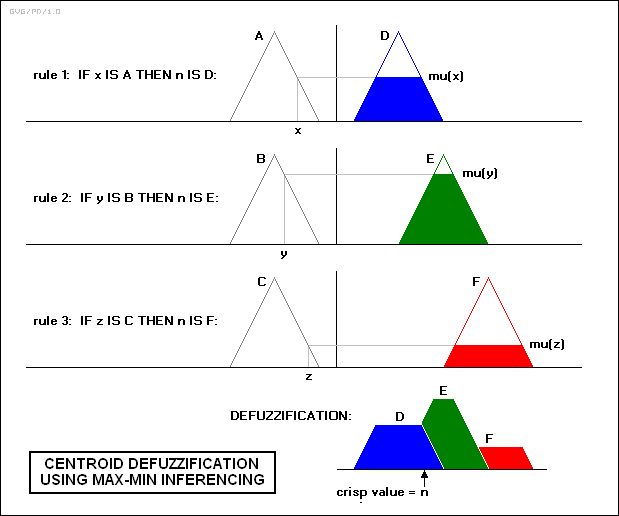
A particular defuzzification method

Defuzzification is the process of producing a quantifiable result in crisp logic, given fuzzy sets and corresponding membership degrees. It is the process that maps a fuzzy set to a crisp set.

It is typically needed in fuzzy control systems. These systems will have a number of rules that transform a number of variables into a fuzzy result, that is, the result is described in terms of membership in fuzzy sets. For example, rules designed to decide how much pressure to apply might result in "Decrease Pressure (15%), Maintain Pressure (34%), Increase Pressure (72%)". Defuzzification is interpreting the membership degrees of the fuzzy sets into a specific decision or real value.

The simplest but least useful defuzzification method is to choose the set with the highest membership, in this case, "Increase Pressure" since it has a 72% membership, and ignore the others, and convert this 72% to some number. The problem with this approach is that it loses information. The rules that called for decreasing or maintaining pressure might as well have not been there in this case.

A common and useful defuzzification technique is center of gravity. First, the results of the rules must be added together in some way. The most typical fuzzy set membership function has the graph of a triangle. Now, if this triangle were to be cut in a straight horizontal line somewhere between the top and the bottom, and the top portion were to be removed, the remaining portion forms a trapezoid. The first step of defuzzification typically "chops off" parts of the graphs to form trapezoids (or other shapes if the initial shapes were not triangles). For example, if the output has "Decrease Pressure (15%)", then this triangle will be cut 15% the way up from the bottom. In the most common technique, all of these trapezoids are then superimposed one upon another, forming a single geometric shape. Then, the centroid of this shape, called the fuzzy centroid, is calculated. The x coordinate of the centroid is the defuzzified value.

== Methods ==
There are many different methods of defuzzification available, including the following:

- AI (adaptive integration)
- BADD (basic defuzzification distributions)
- BOA (bisector of area)
- CDD (constraint decision defuzzification)
- COA (center of area)
- COG (center of gravity)
- ECOA (extended center of area)
- EQM (extended quality method)
- FCD (fuzzy clustering defuzzification)
- FM (fuzzy mean)
- FOM (first of maximum)
- GLSD (generalized level set defuzzification)
- ICOG (indexed center of gravity)
- IV (influence value)
- LOM (last of maximum)
- MeOM (mean of maxima)
- MOM (middle of maximum)
- QM (quality method)
- RCOM (random choice of maximum)
- SLIDE (semi-linear defuzzification)
- WFM (weighted fuzzy mean)

The maxima methods are good candidates for fuzzy reasoning systems. The distribution methods and the area methods exhibit the property of continuity that makes them suitable for fuzzy controllers.

== See also ==
- Fuzzy logic
- Fuzzy set
- Fuzzy control
