= IEEE Standards Association =

Operating unit within IEEE

The Institute of Electrical and Electronics Engineers Standards Association (IEEE SA) is an operating unit within IEEE that develops global technical standards in a broad range of industries, including: electric power and energy, artificial intelligence systems, internet of things, consumer technology and consumer electronics, biomedical and health care, learning technology, information technology and robotics, telecommunication, automotive, transportation, home automation, nanotechnology, information assurance, emerging technologies, and many more.

IEEE SA has developed standards for over a century, through a program that offers balance, openness, fair procedures, and consensus. Technical experts from all over the world participate in the development of IEEE standards.

IEEE SA provides a neutral platform that unites communities for standards development and technological innovation and is independent of any government oversight. IEEE SA develops standards that are consensus-based and has two types of standards development participation models. These are individual and entity.

IEEE SA is not a body formally authorized by any government, but rather a community. International Organization for Standardization (ISO), International Electrotechnical Commissionaires (IEC) and International Telecommunication Union (ITU) are recognized international standards organizations. ISO members are national standards bodies such as American American National Standards Institute (ANSI), German Deutsches Institut für Normung (DIN) or Japanese Industrial Standards Committee (JISC). IEC members are so called National Committees, some of which are hosted by national standards bodies. These are not identical to ISO members. Both IEC and ISO develop International Standards that are consensus-based and follow the "one country one vote principle", representing broad industry needs. Their standards cannot be sponsored by individual companies or organizations.

The 2026-2028 IEEE SA President is Dorothy Stanley, who has been active in IEEE for over 45 years. She is a member of the IEEE SA, IEEE Communications Society, IEEE Computer Society, IEEE Quantum Technical Community, and IEEE Women in Engineering.

Prior Presidents of the IEEE SA include Gary Hoffman (2025), Jim Matthews (2023-2024, 2021-2022), Yu Yuan (2023), Robert Fish (2019-2020), F. Don Wright (2017-2018), Bruce Kraemer (2015-2016), and Karen Bartleson (2013-2014).

The 2026 Chair of the IEEE SA Standards Board (SASB) is Lei Wang. Prior SASB chairs include David Law, Gary Hoffman, John Kulick, and J.P. Faure.

The 2026-2027 Chair of the IEEE SA Entity Collaborative Activities Governance Board (CAG) is Daniel Sabin. Prior chairs include Gary Stuebing, Robby Simpson, and Chuck Adams.

== Membership ==
IEEE SA has two membership options that enable enhanced participation in IEEE SA activities, standards development, and governance. These are:

1. Corporate Membership accommodates the needs of organizations of any size, enabling multi-stakeholder participation on corporate or "entity" standards development projects.
2. Individual Membership is designed for independent professionals and others interested in participation in individual standards development projects.

At IEEE SA, participation is open to everyone. However, IEEE SA Individual or Corporate Members benefit from enhanced participation privileges. IEEE SA Members enjoy added benefits, including but not limited to ability to hold working group positions, vote on standards, assume leadership positions in standards working groups and activities, and participate in elections for IEEE SA governing bodies. The IEEE has various related programs in addition to standards development, including Industry Connections, Registries, Conformity Assessment, Alliance Management Services, and IEEE SA Open (for open source).

== Standards ==
=== The standardization process ===
Each year, the IEEE SA conducts over 200 standards ballots, a process by which proposed standards are voted upon for technical reliability and soundness. In 2020, IEEE had over 1,200 active standards, with over 650 standards under development.

Among the more notable IEEE standards are the IEEE 802 LAN/MAN group of standards, with the widely used computer networking standards for both wired (Ethernet, aka IEEE 802.3) and wireless (IEEE 802.11 and IEEE 802.16) networks, IEEE 1547 Standard for Interconnecting Distributed Resources with Electric Power Systems, and ISO/IEEE 11073 Standards for Health Informatics.

The IEEE standards development process can be broken down into six basic steps:

1. Initiating the Project – An IEEE SA Standards Board approved standards committee must oversee a standard project. The Standards Committee provides oversight for the standard from inception to completion. The standards committees are supported by the technical societies within IEEE. To gain authorization for the standard a Project Authorization Request (PAR) is submitted to the IEEE SA Standards Board. The New Standards Committee (NesCom) of the IEEE SA Standards Board reviews the PAR and makes a recommendation to the Standards Board about whether to approve the PAR.
2. Mobilizing the Working Group – After the PAR is approved, a working group of individuals affected by, or interested in, the standard is organized to develop the standard. IEEE SA rules ensure that all Working Group meetings are open and that anyone has the right to attend and contribute to the meetings.
3. Drafting the Standard – The Working Group prepares a draft of the proposed standard. Generally, the draft follows the IEEE Standards Style Manual that sets guidelines for the clauses and format of the standards document.
4. Balloting the Standard – Once a draft of a standard is finalized in the Working Group, the draft is submitted for Balloting approval. The IEEE Standards Department sends an invitation-to-ballot to any individual who has expressed an interest in the subject matter of the standard. Anyone who responds positively to the invitation-to-ballot becomes a member of the balloting group, as long as the individual is an IEEE Standards Association member or has paid a balloting fee. The IEEE requires that a proposed draft of a standard receive a response rate of 75% (i.e., at least 75% of potential ballots are returned) and that, of the responding ballots, at least 75% approve the proposed draft of a standard. If a standard is not approved, the process returns to the drafting of the standard step to modify the standard document to gain approval of the balloting group.
5. Gaining Final Approval – After getting 75% approval, a draft standard, with the balloting comments, are submitted to the IEEE SA Standards Board Review Committee (RevCom). The RevCom reviews the proposed draft of the standard against the IEEE SA Standards Board Bylaws and the stipulations set forth in the IEEE SA Standards Board Operations Manual. The RevCom then makes a recommendation about whether to approve the submitted draft of the standard document. Each member of the IEEE SA Standards Board places a final vote on the submitted standard document. It takes a majority vote of the Standards Board to gain final approval of a standard.
6. Maintaining the Standard – A standard has a validity period of ten years from the date of IEEE SA Standards Board approval. Amendments that offer minor revisions or extensions to the standard, and corrigenda that makes corrections to the standard can be developed and balloted, but the creation of amendments and corrigenda does not affect the ten-year validity rule. At the end of this period, one of two things must happen: revision or withdrawal. If no action is taken, the standard will be moved to inactive-reserved status. Sometimes a standard may need a technical or editorial correction to be made. As part of the standards development process, IEEE can accommodate this by issuing a corrigenda or errata Sheet.

IEEE SA supports development, production, and distribution of standards by:

- Reaching across borders and disciplines to inspire participation in standards development
- Upholding a framework for the development and maintenance of open, market-driven standards that are voluntarily adopted, based on merit
- Igniting collaboration and building consensus by adhering to fair and equitable practices, proven policies and procedures
- Addressing both established and emerging technologies for maximum human and market benefit
- Supporting standards implementation by providing supplemental resources, products, and services that support development teams
- Providing rigorous oversight to ensure that no single party unfairly influences the standards development process
- Encouraging global adoption through the promotion and international distribution of standards and standards-related resources

=== The patent policy ===
Because the IEEE's standards often incorporate technologies that are covered by one or more patent claims, the IEEE SA has developed and added to its governing bylaws a patent policy to ensure both that the implementers using the standard-essential patented technology in their standard-compliant products have access to that technology and that the patent holders that voluntarily contribute those technologies to the standard receive adequate compensation for the implementers' use. An important part of the IEEE patent policy is the FRAND commitment, which is a voluntary contractual commitment signifying that a patent holder with patented technology that has been adopted into one of the IEEE's standards will accept as adequate compensation a fair, reasonable, and non-discriminatory royalty for third-party use of that technology. Most standard-setting organizations have developed similar patent policies with similar commitments.

In 2014, the IEEE SA became the center of a large academic debate among economic and legal scholars when it appointed an ad hoc committee to recommend and subsequently draft amendments to the IEEE patent policy, to which the IEEE Board of Governors gave final approval in February 2015 and which went into effect in March 2015. The IEEE said that the reason for the amendments was to increase the clarity of the patent policy and the obligations that the patent policy's FRAND commitment imposes on patent holders seeking to enforce their standard-essential patents. One particularly controversial amendment was a provision that prohibited patent holders from seeking injunctions and exclusion orders (from the ITC) against infringers of standard-essential patents.

The Antitrust Division stated its support for the 2015 patent policy revisions in a business review letter that it issued in January 2015, upon request from the IEEE SA. In the letter, the Antitrust Division said that the provisions would unambiguously produce net benefits for consumers with insignificant anticompetitive implications. At least one commentator has criticized the Antitrust Division's legal and economic analysis put forth in its business review letter of the revisions, claiming that the Antitrust Division exaggerated the patent policy's procompetitive benefits and wrongly dismissed as unlikely some of its potential anticompetitive costs.

=== The IEEE Get Program ===
The IEEE Get Program makes some standards publicly available for download: This program grants public access to view and download current individual standards at zero charges. On July 11, 2017, the IEEE Get Program moved to the IEEE Xplore digital library website and standards eligible for the program past that date will only be made available there. On September 1, 2017, the original website was decommissioned and remains, without further updates, to redirect visitors.

=== Boards and committees ===
A member-elected IEEE SA Board of Governors (BOG) directs the activities of the IEEE SA to establish and maintain policy, provide financial oversight and conduct standards-related activities within IEEE technological fields. It also establishes and oversees boards and committees to carry out the work of the IEEE SA. These boards and committees include:

- The IEEE SA Standards Board, which initiates standards projects and reviews standards in development to ensure consensus, due process, openness, and balance
- The Awards & Recognition Committee, which is responsible for the administration of award programs administered by the IEEE SA
- The Entity Collaborative Activities Governance Board, which serves as an advisory body to IEEE SA Corporate Members and to the IEEE SA BOG to ensure a broad spectrum of industry interests and global perspectives are active
- The Registration Authority Committee, which oversees the activities of the IEEE Registration Authority

== Notable IEEE Standards committees and formats ==
IEEE P80	Guide for Safety in AC Substation Grounding
IEEE 255	Standard Letter Symbols for Semiconductor Devices, IEEE-255-1963
IEEE 260	Standard Letter Symbols for Units of Measurement, IEEE-260-1978 (now 260.1-2004)
IEEE 488	Standard Digital Interface for Programmable Instrumentation, IEEE-488-1978 (now 488.1)
IEEE 519	Recommended Practice and Requirements for Harmonic Control in Electric Power Systems
IEEE 603	Standard Criteria for Safety Systems for Nuclear Power Generating Stations
IEEE 610	Standard Glossary of Software Engineering Terminology
IEEE 754	Floating point arithmetic specifications
IEEE 802	LAN/MAN
IEEE 802.1	Standards for LAN/MAN bridging and management and remote media access control (MAC) bridging
IEEE 802.2	Standards for Logical Link Control (LLC) standards for connectivity
IEEE 802.3	Ethernet Standards for Carrier Sense Multiple Access with Collision Detection (CSMA/CD)
IEEE 802.4	Standards for token passing bus access
IEEE 802.5	Standards for Token Ring access and for communications between LANs and MANs
IEEE 802.6	Standards for information exchange between systems
IEEE 802.7	Standards for broadband LAN cable
IEEE 802.8	Optical fiber connection
IEEE 802.9	Standards for integrated services, like voice.
IEEE 802.10	Standards for LAN/MAN security implementations
IEEE 802.11	Wireless Networking – "Wi-Fi"
IEEE 802.12	Standards for demand priority access method
IEEE 802.14	Standards for cable television broadband communications
IEEE 802.15.2	Bluetooth and Wi-Fi coexistence mechanism
IEEE 802.15.4	Wireless Sensor/Control Networks "Zigbee"
IEEE 802.15.6	Wireless body area network (BAN)
IEEE 802.16	Wireless Networking – "WiMAX"
IEEE 802.24	Standards for Logical Link Control (LLC) standards for connectivity
IEEE 828	Configuration Management in Systems and Software Engineering
IEEE 829	Software Test Documentation
IEEE 830	Software Requirements Specifications
IEEE 854	Standard for Radix-Independent Floating-Point Arithmetic, IEEE-854-1987 (replaced by IEEE-754-2008 and newer)
IEEE 896	Futurebus
IEEE P1003.1	Portable Operating System Interface – POSIX
IEEE 1016	Software Design Description
IEEE 1028	Standard for Software Reviews and Audits
IEEE 1044.1	Standard Classification for Software Anomalies
IEEE 1059	Software Verification and Validation Plan
IEEE 1073	Point of Care Medical Device Communication Standards
IEEE 1074	Software Development Life Cycle
IEEE 1076	VHDL – VHSIC hardware description language
IEEE 1149.1	JTAG
IEEE 1149.6	AC-JTAG
IEEE 1180	Discrete cosine transform accuracy
IEEE 1196	NuBus
IEEE 1233	System Requirements Specification
IEEE 1275	Open Firmware
IEEE 1284	Parallel port
IEEE P1363	Public key cryptography
IEEE 1364	Verilog
IEEE 1394	Serial bus – "FireWire", "i.Link"
IEEE 1471	software architecture – system architecture
IEEE 1541	Prefixes for Binary Multiples
IEEE 1547	Standard for Interconnection and Interoperability of Distributed Energy Resources with Associated Electric Power Systems Interfaces
IEEE 1584	Guide for Performing Arc Flash Hazard Calculations
IEEE 1588	Precision Time Protocol
IEEE 1609	Wireless Access in Vehicular Environments (WAVE)
IEEE P1619	Security in Storage Working Group (SISWG)
IEEE 1625	Standard for Rechargeable Batteries for Multi-Cell Mobile Computing Devices
IEEE 1666	IEEE Standard for Standard SystemC Language Reference Manual
IEEE 1667	Standard Protocol for Authentication in Host Attachments of Transient Storage Devices
IEEE 1701	Optical Port Communication Protocol to Complement the Utility Industry End Device Data Tables
IEEE 1800	SystemVerilog
IEEE 1801	Unified Power Format
IEEE 1849	IEEE Standard for eXtensible Event Stream (XES) for Achieving Interoperability in Event Logs and Event Streams
IEEE 1855	IEEE Standard for Fuzzy Markup Language
IEEE 1901	Broadband over Power Line Networks
IEEE 1906.1	Recommended Practice for Nanoscale and Molecular Communication Framework
IEEE 1914	Next Generation Fronthaul Interface Working Group
IEEE 1914.1	Standard for Packet-based Fronthaul Transport Networks
IEEE 1914.3	Standard for Radio Over Ethernet Encapsulations and Mappings
IEEE 2030	Guide for Smart Grid Interoperability of Energy Technology and Information Technology Operation with the Electric Power System (EPS), End-Use Applications, and Loads
IEEE 2030.5	Standard for Smart Energy Profile Application Protocol
IEEE 2050	RTOS for embedded systems standard
IEEE 2143.1	Standard for General Process of Cryptocurrency Payment
IEEE 2413	Standard for an Architectural Framework for the Internet of Things (IoT)
IEEE 2418.2	Approved Draft Standard Data Format for Blockchain Systems
IEEE 2600	Hardcopy Device and System Security (and related ISO/IEC 15408 Protection Profiles)
IEEE 3001.4	Recommended Practice for Estimating the Costs of Industrial and Commercial Power Systems
IEEE 7000	Standard Model Process for Addressing Ethical Concerns during System Design
IEEE 7010	Recommended Practice for Assessing the Impact of Autonomous and Intelligent Systems on Human Well-Being
IEEE 12207	Information Technology – Software life-cycle processes
IEEE C37.2040	Standard Cybersecurity Requirements for Substation Automation, Protection, and Control Systems
IEEE LTSC	IEEE Learning Technology Standards Committee (LTSC)
IEEE Switchgear Committee	C37 series of standards for Low and High voltage equipment
IEEE Transformers Committee	C57 series of standards for the design, testing, repair, installation and operation and maintenance of transformers

== Awards ==
The IEEE SA recognizes outstanding standards development participation through various award categories, including:

- IEEE Standards Association Lifetime Achievement Award
- IEEE SA International Award
