= Fuzzy =

Fuzzy or Fuzzies may refer to:

== Music ==
- Fuzzy (band), a 1990s Boston indie pop band
- Fuzzy (composer), Danish composer Jens Vilhelm Pedersen (born 1939)
- Fuzzy (album), 1993 debut album of American rock band Grant Lee Buffalo
- "Fuzzy", a song from the 2009 Collective Soul album by Collective Soul
- "Fuzzy", a song from Poppy.Computer, the debut 2017 album by Poppy
- Fuzzy, an Australian events company that organises Listen Out, a multi-city Australian music festival

== Nickname ==
- Faustina Agolley (born 1984), Australian television presenter, host of the Australian television show Video Hits
- Fuzzy Haskins (1941–2023), American singer and guitarist with the doo-wop group Parliament-Funkadelic
- Fuzzy Hufft (1901−1973), American baseball player
- Fuzzy Knight (1901−1976), American actor
- Andrew Levane (1920−2012), American National Basketball Association player and coach
- Robert Alfred Theobald (1884−1957), United States Navy rear admiral
- Fuzzy Thurston (1933−2014), American National Football League player
- Fuzzy Vandivier (1903−1983), American high school and college basketball player
- Fuzzy Woodruff (1884−1929), American sportswriter
- Jeff Young (died 2011), co-founder of the American R&B group Somethin' for the People
- Fuzzy Zoeller (1951–2025), American professional golfer

== Fictional characters ==
- Fuzzy Q. Jones, a comic-relief character played by Al St. John (1892-1963) in over 80 Western films
- Fuzzies, an alien species in H. Beam Piper's novel Little Fuzzy and two sequels
- Fuzzy, a recurring Mario enemy

== See also ==
- Fuzzy mathematics, a branch of mathematics
- Fuzzy Control Language, a programming language
- Fuzzy markup language
- Fuzzy Wuzzy (disambiguation)
- Fuzz (disambiguation)
