= IEEE SA International Award =

The IEEE Standard Association Award is presented annually to an IEEE-SA individual member (who is also an IEEE member) who has made an extraordinary contribution to establishing the IEEE-SA as a leader in standardization. Recognition consists of a crystal globe and certificate.

Achieving acceptance of an IEEE standard for worldwide implementation, harmonizing an IEEE standard with international market requirements, and interacting with national and international bodies to enhance their understanding of the SA standards program are examples of promoting the leadership goal.

The International Award is to recognize an IEEE-SA member who whatever the venue or activity, has excelled in this endeavor.

== Recipients ==
- 2025 - Ludwig Winkel

"For outstanding contributions to the fields of industrial automation and international standardization over an extraordinary career spanning nearly five decades."

- 2024 - Teruo Onishi

"For leadership in standardization and harmonization for human protection from millimeter waves exposures."

- 2023 - Dennis Brophy

"For his exemplary leadership to shape the current incarnation of the IEEE SA Corporate Program and for serving as the first chair of the IEEE SA Corporate Advisory Group, creating methodologies that expanded the global reach of IEEE standards development, particularly in China"

- 2022 - Richard H. Hulett

"For global efforts to drive definition, acceptance, and use of electronic design automation standards including IEEE 1076™ (VHDL), IEEE 1666™ (SystemC), and IEEE 1800™ (SystemVerilog)"

- 2021 - Jingxuan (Joanne) Hu
- 2019 - W. Charlton (Chuck) Adams Jr

"For his exemplary leadership to shape the current incarnation of the IEEE SA Corporate Program and for serving as the first chair of the IEEE SA Corporate Advisory Group, creating methodologies that expanded the global reach of IEEE standards development, particularly in China"

- 2019 - Teresa Doran

"For outstanding achievement and dedication to the harmonization of systems and software engineering life-cycle process standards within the international community"

- 2019 - Cheryl Jones

"For exceptional contributions over more than 25 years toward the development of systems engineering standards and guidance systems across many standards development organizations and industry associations, achieving acceptance of multiple IEEE standards for worldwide implementation for systems engineering"

- 2019 - Vikass Monebhurrun

"For significant contributions to the development of international standards related to the field of antennas and propagation"

- 2018 - Leslie T. Falkingham

"For his extraordinary leadership and dedication in the field of Dual Logo standards and acceptance of these standards by the international community"

- 2018 - William Whyte

"For proposing, pursuing, and successfully achieving the harmonization of ETSI and IEEE connected vehicle communications security standards, basing these and future standards on IEEE Std 1609.2-2016 and IEEE Std 1609.2a-2017"

- 2017 - Giorgi Bit-Babik

"For his contribution to international standards for radiofrequency compliance assessment"

- 2017 - Craig A. Colopy

"For selfless dedication to worldwide Step-Voltage Regulator and On-Load Tap Changer standards as IEEE, IEC, and NBR (Brazilian) standards"

- 2016 - Anne A. Bosma

"For exemplary leadership guiding IEEE Switchgear standards toward harmonization with IEC and acceptance by the international community"

- 2015 - Bill Long

"For exemplary leadership as chairman of the working group which upgraded IEEE Std. C37.013 to joint IEEE / IEC 62271-37-013"

- 2015 - J. Patrick Reilly

"For significant contributions in electrostimulation research and its application in harmonization of international safety standards for exposure of humans to low-frequency electric and magnetic fields"

- 2014 - Melvin Reynolds

"For selfless and sustained effort spanning over two decades to advance IEEE medical device informatics and interoperability standardization across international political and organizational boundaries"

- 2014 - John White

"For exemplary work in furthering relations with IEEE and China and in furthering development of IEEE and IEC harmonized standards"

- 2013 - Andrew Myles

"For promoting the global recognition of IEEE 802 LAN/MAN standards as international standards"

- 2012 - David John Law

"For his extraordinary leadership in the creation and deployment of the 802 family of standards and their global acceptance through education and awareness for the past two decades"

- 2011 - Bertram Jon Klauenberg

"For helping to convince world bodies and international agencies of the rigor, benefits, and primacy of IEEE standards and his instrumental role in their adoption"

- 2010 - Robert F. Heile

"For his impact on China's 'The Internet of Things', his vision, humanity, fairness, and tireless dedication to this end"

- 2009 - James R. Michalec

"For contributions to the international harmonization of standards for synchronous generators"

- 2008 - David T. Stone

"For his work with C37.100.1 and C37.60 and acceptance of these standards by the international community"

- 2008 - Hermann Koch

"For dedication and perseverance in harmonization and adoption of standards in the Power Energy Society and standards activities"

- 2007 - James W. Moore

"For considerable contribution to the IEEE Computer Society Software and Systems Engineering Standards Collection (S2ESC) and the international collection of software engineering standards supported by ISO/IEC"

- 2006 - Ben C. Johnson

"For his vision and leadership in establishing the IEEE/IEC Dual Logo Agreement, and positioning the IEEE as a leader in international standards development"

- 2006 - Roger B. Marks

"For his dedication to advancing broadband wireless access technology, for leadership in advocating one worldwide BWA standard, and for promoting the international recognition of the IEEE Standards Association"

- 2005 - Denis Dufournet

"For his enthusiastic promotion of circuit breaker standards harmonization based on a deep knowledge of electrical phenomena occurring during the interruption process in circuit breakers "

- 2005 - Carl R. Stevenson

"For his leadership in gaining global radio spectrum for RaduiLANs based on IEEE Standards "

- 2004 - Michael R. Murphy

"For contributions to internationalization of IEEE standards and global harmonization of human exposure limits for radio frequency energy"

- 2003 - Ronald C. Petersen

"For his leadership in establishing an international role for the IEEE Standards Association in the harmonization of standards for electromagnetic safety"

- 2002 - Wallace S. Read

"For a substantial contribution towards accomplishing a greater recognition of IEEE Standards in the international community"
