= IEEE 1849 =

XML format for the interchange of high volume event data

The IEEE STANDARD 1849-2016, IEEE Standard for eXtensible Event Stream (XES) for Achieving Interoperability in Event Logs and Event Streams, is a technical standard developed by the IEEE Standards Association. It standardizes "a language to transport, store, and exchange (possibly large volumes of) event data (e.g., for process mining)". In 2023, the standard has been revised in and superseded by the IEEE Standard 1849-2023.

Process mining aims to discover, monitor and improve processes by extracting knowledge from event logs representing actual process executions in a given setting. Process mining depends on the availability of accurate and unambiguous event logs, according to established standards. The purpose of this standard is to provide a generally acknowledged (W3C) XML format for the interchange of event data between information systems in many applications domains on the one hand and analysis tools for such data on the other hand. As such, this standard aims to fix the syntax and the semantics of the event data which, for example, is being transferred from the site generating this data to the site analyzing this data. As a result of this standard, if the event data is transferred using the syntax as described by this standard, its semantics will be well understood and clear at both sites.

IEEE 1849 was the second IEEE Standard Sponsored by the IEEE Computational Intelligence Society. The first was IEEE 1855.

== IEEE Standard 1849-2023 ==
The 2023 revision of the standard has been approved on the 5th of June 2023 and introduces the following changes:

- new Micro, Software Event, Software Communication, Software Telemetry, and Artifact Lifecycle extensions
- updated lists of tools supporting the standard, event logs using the standard, and publications that mention the standard
- updated XES Schema definition, fixing a flaw related to the position of the log attributes
- updated bibliography
