= IEEE 802 =

IEEE standards for local and metropolitan area networks

IEEE 802 is a family of Institute of Electrical and Electronics Engineers (IEEE) standards for local area networks (LANs), personal area networks (PANs), and metropolitan area networks (MANs). The IEEE 802 LAN/MAN Standards Committee (LMSC) maintains these standards. The IEEE 802 family of standards has had twenty-four members, numbered 802.1 through 802.24, with a working group of the LMSC devoted to each. However, not all of these working groups are currently active.

The IEEE 802 standards are restricted to computer networks carrying variable-size packets, unlike cell relay networks, for example, in which data is transmitted in short, uniformly sized units called cells. Isochronous signal networks, in which data is transmitted as a steady stream of octets, or groups of octets, at regular time intervals, are also outside the scope of the IEEE 802 standards.

The most widely used IEEE 802 standards are for Ethernet, bridging and virtual bridged LANs, wireless LAN, wireless PAN, wireless MAN, wireless RAN, wireless coexistence, and media-independent handover.

== Etymology ==
The number 802 has no significance: it was simply the next number in the sequence that the IEEE used for standards projects.

== Abstraction layers ==
Side-by-side comparison between the OSI (left) and IEEE 802 (right) reference models

The services and protocols specified in IEEE 802 map to the lower two layers (data link and physical) of the seven-layer Open Systems Interconnection (OSI) networking reference model. IEEE 802 divides the OSI data link layer into two sub-layers: logical link control (LLC) and medium access control (MAC), as follows:

- Data link layer
  - LLC sublayer
  - MAC sublayer
- Physical layer

The conceptual interfaces between these layers are known as Service Access Points (SAPs), e.g., PHY Service Access Point (PSAP) representing the interface where the physical Layer provides services to the MAC sublayer. Similarly, for the MSAP and LSAP, which provide services to the next sublayer up (see diagram above).

Everything above LLC is explicitly out of scope for IEEE 802 (as "upper layer protocols", presumed to be parts of equally non-OSI Internet reference model).

== Working groups ==
Name	Description	Status
IEEE 802.1	Higher Layer LAN Protocols Working Group	Active
IEEE 802.2	LLC	Disbanded
IEEE 802.3	Ethernet	Active
IEEE 802.4	Token bus	Disbanded
IEEE 802.5	Token Ring MAC layer	Disbanded
IEEE 802.6	MANs (DQDB)	Disbanded
IEEE 802.7	Broadband LAN using Coaxial Cable	Disbanded
IEEE 802.8	Fiber Optic TAG	Disbanded
IEEE 802.9	Integrated Services LAN (ISLAN or isoEthernet)	Disbanded
IEEE 802.10	Interoperable LAN Security	Disbanded
IEEE 802.11	Wireless LAN (WLAN) & Mesh (Wi-Fi certification)	Active
IEEE 802.12	100BaseVG	Disbanded
IEEE 802.13	Unused	Reserved for Fast Ethernet development
IEEE 802.14	Cable modems	Disbanded
IEEE 802.15	Wireless PAN	Active
IEEE 802.15.1	Bluetooth certification	Disbanded
IEEE 802.15.2	IEEE 802.15 and IEEE 802.11 coexistence	Hibernating
IEEE 802.15.3	High-Rate wireless PAN (e.g., UWB, etc.)	?
IEEE 802.15.4	Low-Rate wireless PAN (e.g., Zigbee, WirelessHART, MiWi, etc.)	Active
IEEE 802.15.5	Mesh networking for WPAN	?
IEEE 802.15.6	Body area network	Active
IEEE 802.15.7	Visible light communications	?
IEEE 802.16	Broadband Wireless Access (WiMAX certification)	Hibernating
IEEE 802.16.1	Local Multipoint Distribution Service	Hibernating
IEEE 802.16.2	Coexistence wireless access	Hibernating
IEEE 802.17	Resilient packet ring	Disbanded
IEEE 802.18	Radio Regulatory TAG	Active
IEEE 802.19	Wireless Coexistence Working Group	Active
IEEE 802.20	Mobile Broadband Wireless Access	Disbanded
IEEE 802.21	Media Independent Handover	Hibernating
IEEE 802.22	Wireless Regional Area Network	Hibernating
IEEE 802.23	Emergency Services Working Group	Disbanded
IEEE 802.24	Vertical Applications TAG	Active

== Sources ==
- Thompson, Geoff (2019). "Ethernet: From Office to Data Center to IoT". Computer. 52 (10): 106–109. doi:10.1109/MC.2019.2930099. ISSN 0018-9162.
