= Maria Zemankova =

American computer scientist

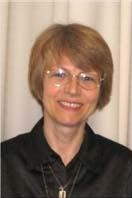
Maria Zemankova

Maria Zemankova (born 6 January 1951) is a computer scientist who is known for the theory and implementation of the first fuzzy relational database system. This research has become important for the handling of approximate queries in databases. She retired from the Intelligent Information Systems Division at the National Science Foundation in July 2020. She is the first (1992) recipient of the SIGMOD Contributions Award for her work in the conception of initiatives in research on scientific databases and digital libraries. She received her B.S. in mathematics and computer science in 1977 from the American University in Cairo. She received her Ph.D. in computer science in 1983 from Florida State University for her work on fuzzy relational database systems.
