= Rudolf Kruse =

German computer scientist and mathematician

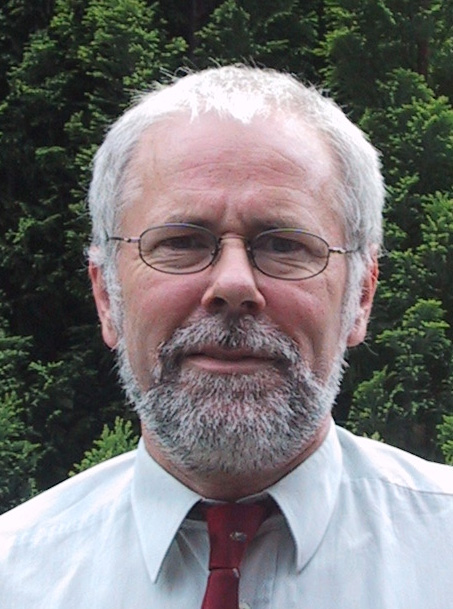
Rudolf Kruse

Rudolf Kruse (born 12 September 1952 in Rotenburg/Wümme) is a German computer scientist and mathematician.

== Education and professional career ==
Rudolf Kruse obtained his diploma (Mathematics) degree in 1979 from the TU Braunschweig, Germany, and a PhD in Mathematics in 1980 as well as the venia legendi in Mathematics in 1984 from the same university. Following a stay at the Fraunhofer Society, in 1986 he joined the University of Braunschweig as a professor of computer science. From 1996–2017 he was a professor at the Department of Computer Science of the Otto-von-Guericke Universität Magdeburg where he has been leading the computational intelligence research group. Since October 2017 he has been an emeritus professor.

== Research activities ==
He has carried out research and projects in data science, artificial intelligence, fuzzy systems, and computational intelligence. His research group was successful in various industrial applications.

Kruse has coauthored 40 books as well as more than 450 refereed technical papers in various scientific areas. He is a fellow of the International Fuzzy Systems Association (IFSA), fellow of the European Association for Artificial Intelligence (EurAI) and fellow of the Institute of Electrical and Electronics Engineers (IEEE).
