= Fuzz =

Fuzz may refer to:

- Fuzz (film), a 1972 American comedy
- Fuzz: When Nature Breaks the Law, a nonfiction book by Mary Roach
- The fuzz, a slang term for police officers
- Fuzzing or fuzz testing, automated software testing technique
- "The Fuzz", the theme song for the Brazilian news program Jornal Nacional

== Music ==
- Fuzz (electric guitar), distortion effects to create "warm" and "dirty" sounds
- Fuzz (band), a garage rock band featuring Ty Segall, Charles Moothart and Chad Ubovich
  - Fuzz (Fuzz album), their 2013 debut studio album
- The Fuzz (band), a 1970s American female vocal trio
  - The Fuzz (album), their 1970 debut album
- Fuzz (Alice Donut album), 2006 punk album
- Fuzz (Junkhouse album), 1996 rock album
- "Fuzz", a 2007 song by Japanese rock band Mucc
- "Fuzz", a song by Duane Eddy, featured on his 1959 album Especially For You

== People ==
- Fuzz White (1916–2003), Major League Baseball player
- Calvin "Fuzz" Jones (1926–2010), American electric blues bassist and singer
- Steve "Fuzz" Kmak (born 1970), American bassist who formerly played in the heavy metal band Disturbed
- Fuzz Scoota, American underground rapper who performs with D12
- Fuzz Townshend (born 1964), British drummer
- María Fernanda Malo (born 1985), Mexican actress also known as Fuzz
- James "Fuzz" San Giovanni, American musician who performs in Deep Banana Blackout

== See also ==
- Fuzzy (disambiguation)
