= Fuzzy Wuzzy =

Fuzzy Wuzzy or Fuzzy-Wuzzy can refer to:

- Fuzzy Wuzzy, a fictional bear in "Fuzzy Wuzzy Was a Bear", a nursery rhyme
- Fuzzy-Wuzzy, a nickname of the Hadenoa people of East Africa, so named for their elaborate hairstyles
- "Fuzzy-Wuzzy", a poem by Rudyard Kipling based on the Hadenoa tribe
- Fuzzy Wuzzy (color), formerly one of the shades of brown Crayola crayon colors
- Fuzzy Wuzzy Angels, the name given to Papua New Guineans who assisted injured Australian troops during World War II

== See also ==
- Woolly bear (disambiguation), including a number of species of hairy caterpillars
