= IEEE 802.18 =

IEEE 802.18, the Radio Regulatory Technical Advisory Group ("RR-TAG"), is a working group of IEEE 802, the LAN/MAN Standards Committee (LMCS). The working group currently has 6 projects on standards for radio-based systems:

- IEEE 802.11 (Wireless Local area network- WLAN)
- IEEE 802.15 (Wireless Personal area network - WPAN)
- IEEE 802.16 (Wireless Metropolitan area network - WMAN)
- IEEE 802.20 (Wireless Mobility)
- IEEE 802.21 (Hand-off/Interoperability Between Networks)
- IEEE 802.22 (Wireless Regional Area Network - WRAN).

The RR-TAG monitors the interests of the above 6 projects, at both national and international levels, and then makes comments and recommends policies to regulators, which balance the interests of all the wireless LMCS projects.
