= IEEE 802.19 =

Working group

IEEE 802.19 is the Wireless Coexistence Working Group (WG) within the IEEE 802 LAN/MAN Standards Committee. The WG deals with coexistence between unlicensed wireless networks. Many of the IEEE 802 wireless standards use unlicensed spectrum and hence need to address the issue of coexistence. These unlicensed wireless devices may operate in the same unlicensed frequency band in the same location. This can lead to interference between these two wireless networks.

== Background ==
Multiple unlicensed wireless networks are said to coexist if they can operate in the same location. Positive coexistence occurs when multiple wireless networks coexist without causing significant performance degradation to one another. One of the first examples of wireless coexistence addressed within the IEEE 802 LAN/MAN Standards Committee was between IEEE 802.11 and Bluetooth, both operating in the 2.4 GHz ISM frequency band. Achieving positive coexistence between these two wireless networks was addressed by the IEEE 802.15 Task Group 2, which produced a Recommended Practice on Coexistence of IEEE 802.11 and Bluetooth.

== Overview ==
Currently the 802.19 WG addresses coexistence between wireless standards under development within IEEE 802. There are a number of IEEE 802 wireless standards which may use unlicensed spectrum and for which coexistence must be considered by the Working Groups developing standards. These include

- IEEE 802.11 Wireless Local Area Networks (WLAN)
- IEEE 802.15 Wireless Personal Area Networks (WPAN)
- IEEE 802.16 Wireless Metropolitan Area Networks (WMAN)
- IEEE 802.22 Wireless Regional Area Networks (WRAN)

Not that the IEEE 802.16 and IEEE 802.22 Working Groups have been merged into the IEEE 802.15 Working Group.

When a new standard (or amendment to a standard) for an unlicensed wireless network is being developed the working group may develop a Coexistence Assessment (CA) document that is reviewed the IEEE 802.19 WG. In addition to evaluating CA documents, The IEEE 802.19 Working Group has produced 2 standards to date:

The most recent standard produced by the IEEE 802.19 Working Group was published in 2021: IEEE Std 802.19.3 is a recommended practice that provides guidance on the implementation, configuration, and commissioning of systems sharing spectrum between IEEE Std 802.11ah™-2016 and IEEE Std 802.15.4™ smart utility networking (SUN) frequency shift keying (FSK) physical layer (PHY) operating in sub-1 GHz frequency bands. The IEEE Std 802.15.4™ smart utility networking (SUN) frequency shift keying (FSK) physical layer (PHY) is commonly referred to as 802.15.4g in the wireless industry.

Previously, the IEEE 802.19 Working Group produced IEEE Std 802.19.1, published in 2018, which provides radio technology independent methods for network-based coexistence among dissimilar or independently operated networks of unlicensed devices and dissimilar unlicensed devices. IEEE Std 802.19.1 defines methods for systems using geo-location capable devices operating under general authorization such as TV band White Spaces, the 5 GHz license-exempt bands and the general authorized access the 3.5 GHz bands.
