= Sendai Subway 1000 series =

Japanese train type

Sendai Subway 1000N series
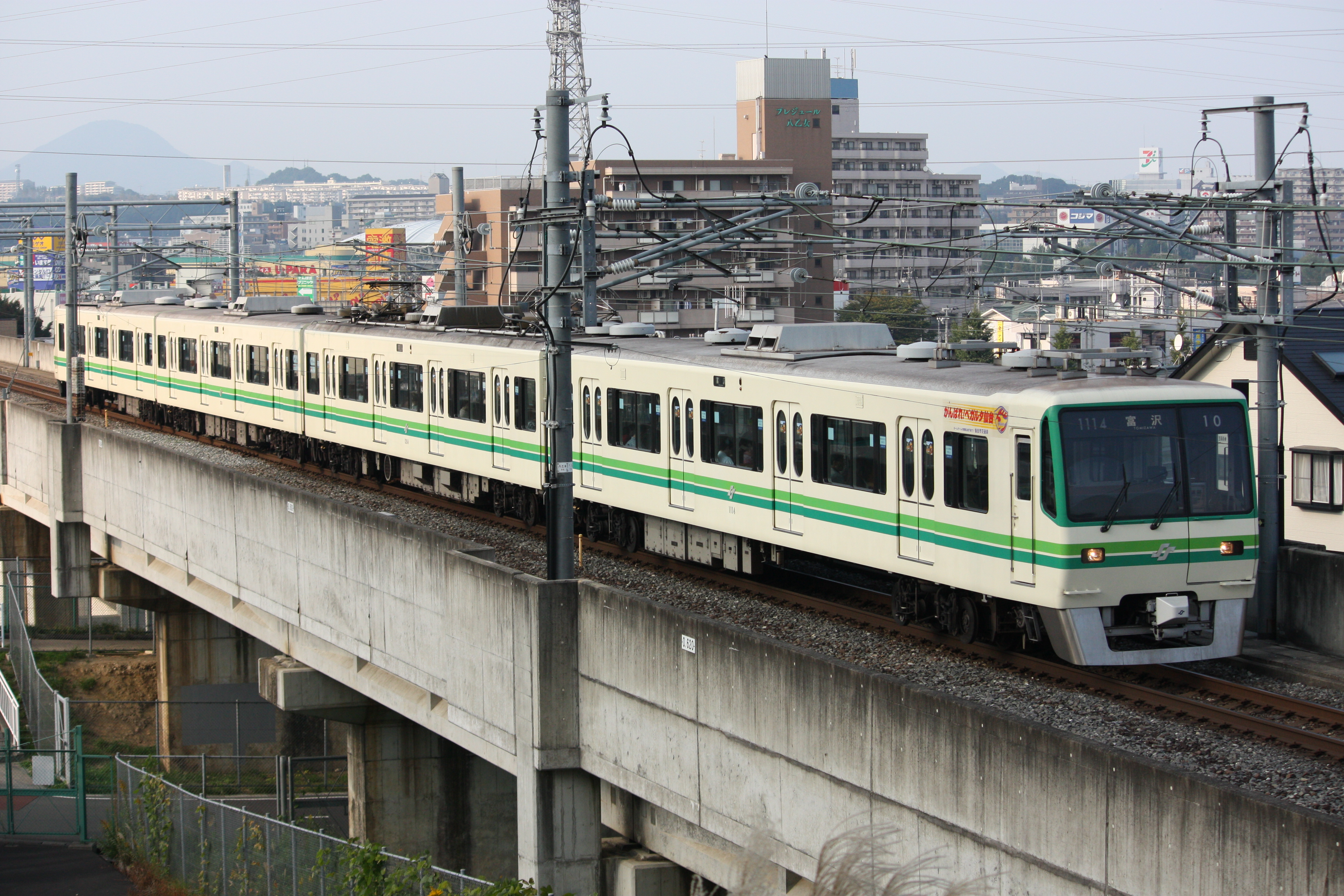
- A Sendai Subway 1000N series train, October 2008

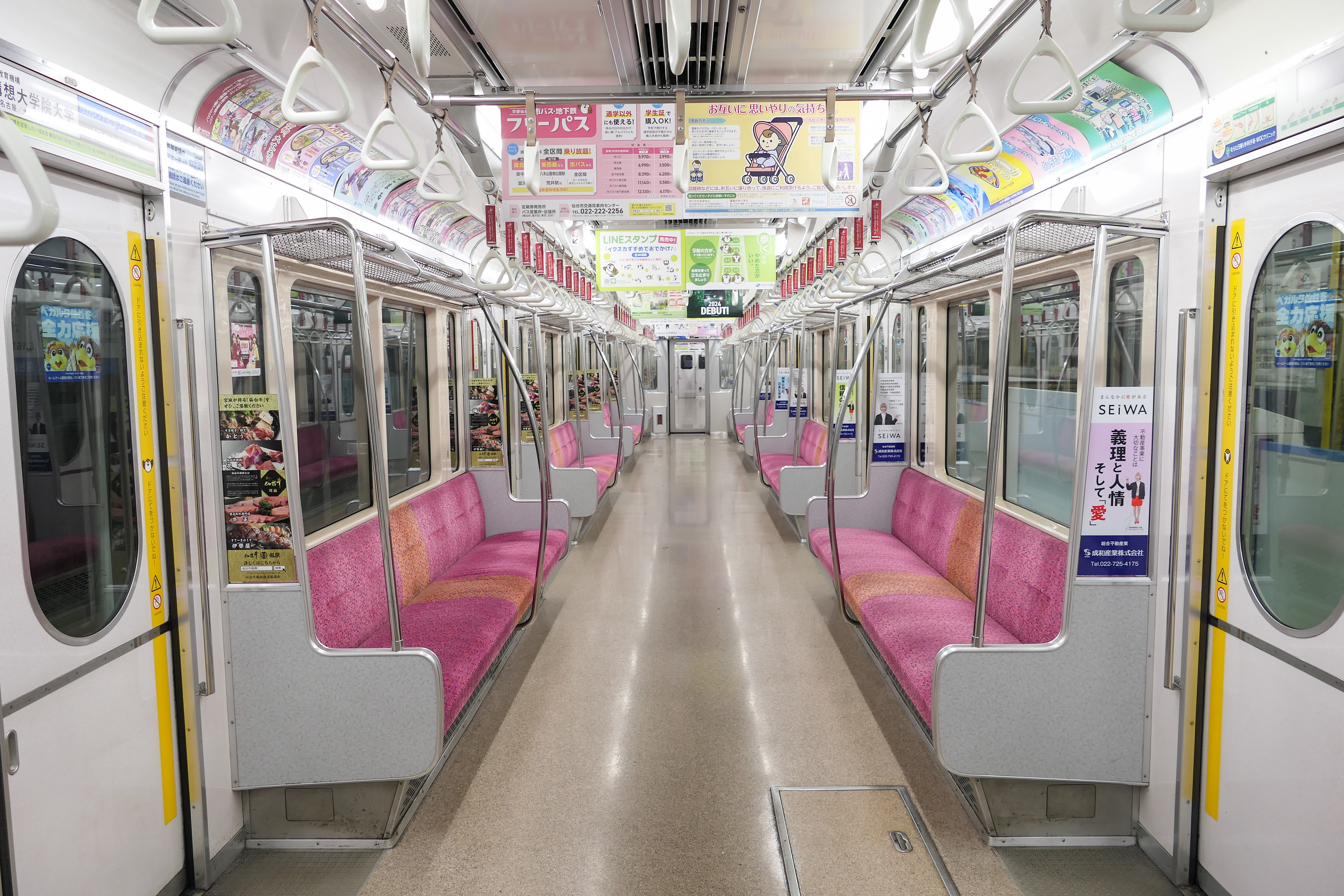
- Interior
- In service: 1987–present
- Manufacturer: Kawasaki
- Constructed: 1985–1996
- Refurbished: 2003–2013
- Number built: 84 vehicles (21 sets)
- Formation: 4 cars per trainset
- Capacity: 144 passengers per car (58 seating, 54 post-refurbishment)
- Operator: Sendai City Transportation Bureau
- Line served: Sendai Subway Namboku Line

Specifications
- Car length: 21,750 mm (71 ft 4 in) (end cars); 20,000 mm (65 ft 7 in) (intermediate cars)
- Width: 2,890 mm (9 ft 6 in)
- Height: 4,040 mm (13 ft 3 in)
- Doors: 4 pairs per side
- Maximum speed: 75 km/h (47 mph)
- Weight: 128.0 t (126.0 long tons; 141.1 short tons)
- Traction system: Chopper control (as built); IGBT–VVVF (post-refurbishment)
- Traction motors: Series-wound DC (as built); Asynchronous 3-phase AC (as refurbished)
- Power output: 160 kW (215 hp) per motor
- Transmission: Westinghouse-Natal drive; gear ratio: 5.73 : 1 (86 / 15)
- Acceleration: 3.0 km/(h⋅s) (1.9 mph/s) (as built); 3.5 km/(h⋅s) (2.2 mph/s) (post-refurbishment)
- Deceleration: 3.7 km/(h⋅s) (2.3 mph/s) (service); 4.5 km/(h⋅s) (2.8 mph/s) (emergency)
- Electric systems: 1,500 V DC (overhead catenary)
- Current collection: Pantograph
- Bogies: SS-005, SS-105
- Braking system: Electromagnetic braking
- Safety system: ATC/ATO (Fuzzy logic)
- Track gauge: 1,067 mm (3 ft 6 in)

The Sendai Subway 1000N series (仙台市交通局1000N系電車) is a rapid transit electric multiple unit (EMU) train type operated on the Sendai Subway Namboku Line in Sendai, Japan.

The 1000 series was the world's first train type to use fuzzy logic to control its speed, and this system developed by Hitachi accounts for the relative smoothness of the starts and stops when compared to other trains, and is 10% more energy efficient than human-controlled acceleration. It was the recipient of the 28th Laurel Prize award presented by the Japan Railfan Club.

== Formation ==
Sets are formed as follows, with car 1 at the Tomizawa end.

Car No.	1	2	3	4
Designation	Tc1	M1	M2	Tc2
Numbering	1100	1200	1300	1600

== History ==
First entering service in 1987, the fleet of 21 sets was constructed between 1985 and 1996.

=== Refurbishment ===
From 2003 until 2013, the 1000 series trains underwent mid-life refurbishment to extend their lifespan. Refurbished sets are renamed 1000N series, with the first such set returning to service in March 2004.

The refurbished trains include the following features.

- LED destination indicators at the train ends
- Space for wheelchairs
- Air-conditioning
- LED destination indicators inside trains

=== Replacement ===
The 1000N series sets are scheduled to be replaced with new 3000 series trains from 2024.

== See also ==
- Sendai Subway 2000 series
