= IEEE P80 =

IEEE standard P80 is a technical standard of the Institute of Electrical and Electronics Engineers (IEEE), governing outdoor AC substations (although under special circumstances it may also be applied to indoor AC substations). It was last approved on the 28th September, 2017. The standard governs requirements for the grounding and insulation of substations for safety purposes. The standard, along with IEEE P81, is widely used within the industry in power applications.

== Specifications ==
For AC currents at the frequency used for power grids (i.e. 50 or 60 Hz), the threshold of lethality for current passing through the human body is only 0.1 A, although this value can be much higher for short surges, or for higher frequencies. As a result, the standard recommends an emphasis on fast fault clearing time in order to reduce both the probability and duration of any potential exposure of humans to dangerous fault current.

In general, a system of horizontal grid conductors and vertical rods and electrodes is recommended. This is to reduce the aforementioned fault clearing time, as well as ensuring that there are multiple paths for a high fault current to dissipate, ensuring that ground potential gradients dangerous to those standing near the substation will not occur. An example implementation given consists of copper rods buried 0.3-0.5m below ground, and spaced 3-7m apart. In situations where space is at a premium, or other difficulties prevent the construction of a proper grounding grid, ground rods may be driven in deeper, and a wire mat may also be used.
