= IEEE 802.7 =

International standard

IEEE 802.7 is a withdrawn sub-standard of the IEEE 802 which covered broadband local area networks. The standard was approved in 1989 and withdrawn in 2003.
