= IEEE 802.8 =

The Fiber Optic Technical Advisory Group was to create a LAN standard for fiber optic media used in token passing computer networks like FDDI. This was part of the IEEE 802 group of standards.

The group had given up and disbanded itself and is no longer a part of IEEE standards.
