= IEEE 802.9 =

The 802.9 Working Group of the IEEE 802 networking committee developed standards for integrated voice and data access over existing Category 3 twisted-pair network cable installations. Its major standard was usually known as isoEthernet.

IsoEthernet combines 10 megabits per second Ethernet and 96 64-kilobits per second ISDN B channels. It was originally developed to provide data and voice/video over the same wire without degradation by fixing the amount of bandwidth assigned to the Ethernet and B-channel sides.

There was some vendor support for isoEthernet, but it lost in the marketplace due to the rapid adoption of Fast Ethernet and the working group was disbanded.
