= Woolly bear =

Woolly bear may refer to:

- The hairy caterpillar of any of the moth subfamily Arctiinae
- The hairy caterpillar of the banded woolly bear (Pyrrharctia isabella)
- The hairy caterpillar of the Arctic woolly bear moth (Gynaephora groenlandica)
- The hairy caterpillar of the spotted tussock moth (Lophocampa maculata)
- The larva of the varied carpet beetle
- An episode of Thomas the Tank Engine and Friends
- A type of thermal undersuit worn under a dry suit
