= Distributed-queue dual-bus =

In telecommunications, a distributed-queue dual-bus network (DQDB) is a distributed multi-access network that (a) supports integrated communications using a dual bus and distributed queuing, (b) provides access to local or metropolitan area networks, and (c) supports connectionless data transfer, connection-oriented data transfer, and isochronous communications, such as voice communications.

IEEE 802.6 is an example of a network providing DQDB access methods.

== Concept of operation ==
The DQDB medium access control (MAC) algorithm is generally credited to Robert Newman who developed this algorithm in his PhD thesis in the 1980s at the University of Western Australia. To appreciate the innovative value of the DQDB MAC algorithm, it must be seen against the background of LAN protocols at that time, which were based on broadcast (such as IEEE 802.3 Ethernet) or a ring (like IEEE 802.5 Token Ring and FDDI). The DQDB may be thought of as two token rings, one carrying data in each direction around the ring. This improves reliability which is important in Metropolitan Area Networks (MAN), where repairs may take longer than in a LAN and Wi-Fi because the damage may be inaccessible.

The DQDB standard IEEE 802.6 was developed while ATM (Broadband ISDN) was still in early development, but there was strong interaction between the two standards. ATM cells and DQDB frames were harmonized. They both settled on essentially a 48-byte data frame with a 5-byte header. In the DQDB algorithm, a distributed queue was implemented by communicating queue state information via the header. Each node in a DQDB network maintains a pair of state variables which represent its position in the distributed queue and the size of the queue. The headers on the reverse bus communicated requests to be inserted in the distributed queue so that upstream nodes would know that they should allow DQDB cells to pass unused on the forward bus. The algorithm was remarkable for its extreme simplicity.

Currently DQDB systems are being installed by many carriers in entire cities, with lengths that reach up to 160 km (99 mi) with speeds of a DS3 line (44.736 Mbit/s). Other implementations use optical fiber for a length of up to 100 km and speeds around 150 Mbit/s.
