= Fuzzy Control Language =

Domain-specific programming language

Fuzzy Control Language, or FCL, is a language for implementing fuzzy logic, especially fuzzy control. It was standardized by IEC 61131-7. It is a domain-specific programming language: it has no features unrelated to fuzzy logic, so it is impossible to even print "Hello, world!". Therefore, one does not write a program in FCL, but one may write part of it in FCL.

== Example ==
RULE 0: IF (temperature IS cold) THEN (output IS low)
RULE 1: IF (temperature IS very cold) THEN (output IS high)

== Limitations ==
FCL is not an entirely complete fuzzy language, for instance, it does not support "hedges", which are adverbs that modify the set. For instance, the programmer cannot write:

RULE 0: If (Temperature is VERY COLD) then (Output is VERY HIGH)

However, the programmer can simply define new sets for "very cold" and "very high". FCL also lacks support for higher-order fuzzy sets, subsets, and so on. None of these features are essential to fuzzy control, although they may be nice to have.
