= IEEE 802.6 =

International networking standard

IEEE 802.6 is a standard governed by the ANSI for Metropolitan Area Networks (MAN). It is an improvement of an older standard (also created by ANSI) which used the Fiber distributed data interface (FDDI) network structure. The FDDI-based standard failed due to its expensive implementation and lack of compatibility with current LAN standards. The IEEE 802.6 standard uses the Distributed Queue Dual Bus (DQDB) network form. This form supports 150 Mbit/s transfer rates. It consists of two unconnected unidirectional buses. DQDB is rated for a maximum of 160 km before significant signal degradation over fiberoptic cable with an optical wavelength of 1310 nm.

This standard has also failed, mostly for the same reasons that the FDDI standard failed. MANs are traditionally designed using Synchronous Optical Network (SONET), Synchronous Digital Hierarchy (SDH) or Asynchronous Transfer Mode (ATM). Recent designs use native Ethernet or MPLS.
