= Fuzzy concept =

Varying application boundaries

A fuzzy concept is an idea of which the boundaries of application can vary considerably according to context or conditions, instead of being fixed once and for all. That means the idea is somewhat vague or imprecise. Yet it is not unclear or meaningless. It has a definite meaning, which can often be made more exact with further elaboration and specification — including a closer definition of the context in which the concept is used. The inverse of a "fuzzy concept" is a "crisp concept" (i.e. a precise concept). Fuzzy concepts are often used to navigate imprecision in the real world, when precise information is not available and an approximate indication is sufficient to be helpful.

Although the linguist George Philip Lakoff already defined the semantics of a fuzzy concept in 1973 (inspired by an unpublished 1971 paper by Eleanor Rosch,) the term "fuzzy concept" rarely received a standalone entry in dictionaries, handbooks and encyclopedias. Sometimes it was defined in encyclopedia articles on fuzzy logic, or it was simply equated with a mathematical “fuzzy set”. A fuzzy concept can be "fuzzy" for many different reasons in different contexts. This makes it harder to provide a precise definition that covers all cases. Paradoxically, the definition of fuzzy concepts may itself be somewhat "fuzzy". Lotfi A. Zadeh, known as "the father of fuzzy logic", claimed that "vagueness connotes insufficient specificity, whereas fuzziness connotes unsharpness of class boundaries". Not all scholars agree.

With increasing academic literature on the subject, the term "fuzzy concept" is now more widely recognized as a philosophical, linguistic or scientific category, and the study of the characteristics of fuzzy concepts and fuzzy language is known as fuzzy semantics. “Fuzzy logic” has become a generic term for many different kinds of many-valued logics, and is applied in many different areas of research, computer programming and industrial design.

For engineers, "Fuzziness is imprecision or vagueness of definition." For computer scientists, a fuzzy concept is an idea which is "to an extent applicable" in a situation. It means that the concept can have gradations of significance or unsharp (variable) boundaries of application — a "fuzzy statement" is a statement which is true "to some extent", and that extent can often be represented by a scaled value (a score). For mathematicians, a "fuzzy concept" is usually a fuzzy set or a combination of such sets (see fuzzy mathematics and fuzzy set theory). In cognitive linguistics, the things that belong to a "fuzzy category" exhibit gradations of family resemblance, and the borders of the category are not clearly defined.

Through most of the 20th century, the idea of reasoning with fuzzy concepts faced considerable resistance from Western academic elites. They did not want to endorse the use of imprecise concepts in research or argumentation, and they often regarded fuzzy logic with suspicion, derision or even hostility. That may partly explain why the idea of a "fuzzy concept" did not get a separate entry in encyclopedias, handbooks and dictionaries.

Yet although people might not be aware of it, the use of fuzzy concepts has risen gigantically in all walks of life from the 1970s onward. That is mainly due to advances in electronic engineering, fuzzy mathematics and digital computer programming. The new technology allows very complex inferences about "variations on a theme" to be anticipated and fixed in a program. The Perseverance Mars rover, a driverless NASA vehicle used to explore the Jezero crater on the planet Mars, features fuzzy logic programming that steers it through rough terrain. Similarly, to the North, the Chinese Mars rover Zhurong used fuzzy logic algorithms to calculate its travel route in Utopia Planitia from sensor data.

New neuro-fuzzy computational methods make it possible for machines to identify, measure, adjust and respond to fine gradations of significance with great precision. It means that practically useful concepts can be coded, sharply defined, and applied to all kinds of tasks, even if ordinarily these concepts are never exactly defined. Nowadays engineers, statisticians and programmers often represent fuzzy concepts mathematically, using fuzzy logic, fuzzy values, fuzzy variables and fuzzy sets (see also fuzzy set theory). Fuzzy logic is not "woolly thinking", but a "precise logic of imprecision" which reasons with graded concepts and gradations of truth. Fuzzy concepts and fuzzy logic often play a significant role in artificial intelligence programming, for example because they can model human cognitive processes more easily than other methods.

== Origins ==
Vagueness and fuzziness have probably always been a part of human experience. In the West, ancient texts show that philosophers and scientists were already thinking critically about this in classical antiquity. Most often, they regarded vagueness as a problem: as an obstacle to clear thinking, as a source of confusion, or as an evasive tactic. It got in the way of providing clear orientation, guidance, direction and leadership. Therefore, vagueness became associated with a hermeneutic of suspicion — it was considered as something to avoid, as something undesirable. By contrast, in the ancient Chinese tradition of Daoist thought of Laozi and Zhuang Zhou, "vagueness is not regarded with suspicion, but is simply an acknowledged characteristic of the world around us" — a subject for meditation and a source of insight.

=== Sorites paradox ===
The ancient Sorites paradox raised the logical problem, of how we could exactly define the threshold at which a change in quantitative gradation turns into a qualitative or categorical difference. With some physical processes, this threshold seems relatively easy to identify. For example, water turns into steam at 100 °C or 212 °F. Of course, the boiling point depends partly on atmospheric pressure, which decreases at higher altitudes; it is also affected by the level of humidity — in that sense, the boiling point is "somewhat fuzzy", because it can vary under different conditions. Nevertheless, for every altitude, level of air pressure and degree of humidity, we can predict accurately what the boiling point will be, if we know the relevant conditions.

With many other processes and gradations, however, the point of change is much more difficult to locate, and remains somewhat vague. Thus, the boundaries between qualitatively different things may be unsharp: we know that there are boundaries, but we cannot define them exactly. For example, to identify "the oldest city in the world", we have to define what counts as a city, and at what point a growing human settlement becomes a city.

=== The continuum fallacy and Loki's wager ===
According to the modern idea of the continuum fallacy, the fact that a statement is to an extent vague, does not automatically mean that it has no validity. The question then arises, of how (by what method or approach) we could ascertain and define the validity that the fuzzy statement does have.

The Nordic myth of Loki's wager suggested that concepts that lack precise meanings or lack precise boundaries of application cannot be operated with, because they evade any clear definition. However, the 20th-century idea of "fuzzy concepts" proposes that "somewhat vague terms" can be operated with, because we can explicate and define the variability of their application — by assigning numbers to gradations of applicability. This idea sounds simple enough, but it had large implications.

=== Precursors and pioneers ===
In Western civilization, the intellectual recognition of fuzzy concepts has been traced back to a diversity of famous and less well-known thinkers, including (among many others) Eubulides, Epicurus, Plato, Cicero, William Ockham and John Buridan, Georg Wilhelm Friedrich Hegel, Karl Marx and Friedrich Engels, Friedrich Nietzsche, William James, Hugh MacColl, Charles S. Peirce, Hans Reichenbach, Carl Gustav Hempel, Max Black, Arto Salomaa, Ludwig Wittgenstein, Jan Łukasiewicz, Emil Leon Post, Alfred Tarski, Georg Cantor, Nicolai A. Vasiliev, Kurt Gödel, Stanisław Jaśkowski, Willard Van Orman Quine, George J. Klir, Petr Hájek, Joseph Goguen, Ronald R. Yager, Enrique Héctor Ruspini, Jan Pavelka, Didier Dubois, Bernadette Bouchon-Meunier, and Donald Knuth.

Across at least two and a half millennia, all of them had something to say about graded concepts with unsharp boundaries. This suggests at least that the awareness of the existence of concepts with "fuzzy" characteristics, in one form or another, has a very long history in human thought. Quite a few 20th century logicians, mathematicians and philosophers also tried to analyze the characteristics of fuzzy concepts as a recognized species, sometimes with the aid of some kind of many-valued logic or substructural logic.

An early attempt in the post-WW2 era to create a mathematical theory of sets with gradations of set membership was made by Abraham Kaplan and Hermann F. Schott in 1951. They intended to apply the idea to empirical research. Kaplan and Schott expressed the degree of membership of empirical classes using real numbers between 0 and 1, and they defined corresponding notions of intersection, union, complementation and subset. However, at the time, their idea "fell on stony ground". J. Barkley Rosser Sr. published a treatise on many-valued logics in 1952, anticipating "many-valued sets". Another treatise was published in 1963 by Alexander Zinoviev and others.

In 1964, the American philosopher William Alston introduced the term "degree vagueness" to describe vagueness in an idea that results from the absence of a definite cut-off point along an implied scale (in contrast to "combinatory vagueness" caused by a term that has a number of logically independent conditions of application).

The German mathematician Dieter Klaua published a German-language paper on fuzzy sets in 1965, but he used a different terminology (he referred to "many-valued sets", not "fuzzy sets").

In the late 1960s, two popular introductions to many-valued logic were published by Robert J. Ackermann and Nicholas Rescher. Rescher's book includes a bibliography on fuzzy theory up to 1965, which was extended by Robert Wolf and Joseph De Kerf for 1966–1975. Haack provides references to significant works after 1974. In 1980, Didier Dubois and Henri Prade published a detailed annotated bibliography on the field of fuzzy set theory. George J. Klir and Bo Yuan provided an overview of the subject in Fuzzy sets and fuzzy logic during the mid-1990s. Merrie Bergmann provides a more recent (2008) introduction to fuzzy reasoning. A standard modern reference work is Fuzzy Logic and Mathematics: A Historical Perspective (2017) by Radim Bělohlávek, Joseph W. Dauben and George J. Klir.

=== Lotfi Zadeh's discovery ===
The Azerbaijani-born American computer scientist Lotfi A. Zadeh (1921–2017) is usually credited with inventing the specific idea of a "fuzzy concept" in his seminal 1965 paper on fuzzy sets, because he presented a mathematical formalization of the phenomenon that was widely accepted by scholars. The genesis of Zadeh's discovery has been described as follows:

“As early as 1961, Lotfi and his colleague began writing about the need for some sort of “fuzzy” mathematics to help translate fuzzy human concepts into the concrete instructions computers need. One fateful night in 1964, those fuzzy notions crystalized. Lotfi had plans with friends for dinner that night [in New York], but at the last minute, those plans fell through. As he made his way home, he figured out the critical missing piece for fuzzy math: the idea that things can have a grade of membership to some concept. Say, for instance, whether one is included in a dinner plan, or not.”

In reality, Zadeh did not literally use the expression "fuzzy concept" anywhere in his famous paper. Instead, he explained the concept of a fuzzy set and its formalization (the paper is simply titled "Fuzzy sets"). However, the terms "fuzzy concept" and "fuzzy set" are often treated by engineers and computer scientists as interchangeable expressions. Subsequently, Zadeh played a decisive role in developing the field of fuzzy logic, fuzzy sets and fuzzy systems, with a large number of influential scholarly papers.

Unlike most philosophical theories of vagueness and unlike rival theories of many-valued logic, Zadeh's engineering approach had the great advantage that it could be directly applied to computer programming. Zadeh's seminal 1965 paper is acknowledged to be one of the most-cited scholarly articles in the 20th century. In 2014, it was placed 46th in the list of the world's 100 most-cited research papers of all time. Zadeh's peers called him "one of the most prominent computer scientists of all-time". Since the mid-1960s, many scholars have contributed to elaborating the theory of reasoning with graded concepts, and the research field continues to expand; new methods and applications of fuzzy logic are being invented all the time.

== Definition ==
The ordinary scholarly definition of a concept as "fuzzy" has been in use from the 1970s onward.

=== Criteria ===
Radim Bělohlávek explains:

"There exists strong evidence, established in the 1970s in the psychology of concepts... that human concepts have a graded structure in that whether or not a concept applies to a given object is a matter of degree, rather than a yes-or-no question, and that people are capable of working with the degrees in a consistent way. This finding is intuitively quite appealing, because people say "this product is more or less good" or "to a certain degree, he is a good athlete", implying the graded structure of concepts. In his classic paper, Zadeh called the concepts with a graded structure fuzzy concepts and argued that these concepts are a rule rather than an exception when it comes to how people communicate knowledge. Moreover, he argued that to model such concepts mathematically is important for the tasks of control, decision making, pattern recognition, and the like. Zadeh proposed the notion of a fuzzy set that gave birth to the field of fuzzy logic..."

Hence, a concept is generally regarded as "fuzzy" in a logical sense if:

- defining characteristics of the concept apply to it "to a certain degree or extent" (or, more unusually, "with a certain magnitude of likelihood").
- or, the boundaries of applicability (the truth-value) of a concept can vary in degrees, according to different conditions.
- or, the fuzzy concept itself straightforwardly consists of a fuzzy set, or a combination of such sets.

The fact that a concept is fuzzy does not prevent its use in logical reasoning; it merely affects the type of reasoning which can be applied (see fuzzy logic). If the concept has gradations of meaningful significance, it may be necessary to specify and formalize what those gradations are, if they can make an important difference. Not all fuzzy concepts have the same logical structure, but they can often be formally described or reconstructed using fuzzy logic or other substructural logics. The advantage of this approach is, that numerical notation enables a potentially infinite number of truth-values between complete truth and complete falsehood, and thus it enables — in theory, at least — the greatest precision in stating the degree of applicability of a logical rule.

=== Fuzziness versus uncertainty ===
One of the first scholars who pointed out the need to distinguish the theory of fuzzy sets from probability theory was Zadeh's pupil Joseph Goguen. Petr Hájek, writing about the foundations of fuzzy logic, likewise sharply distinguished between "fuzziness" and "uncertainty":

"The sentence "The patient is young" is true to some degree – the lower the age of the patient (measured e.g. in years), the more the sentence is true. Truth of a fuzzy proposition is a matter of degree. I recommend to everybody interested in fuzzy logic that they sharply distinguish fuzziness from uncertainty as a degree of belief (e.g. probability). Compare the last proposition with the proposition "The patient will survive next week". This may well be considered as a crisp proposition which is either (absolutely) true or (absolutely) false; but we do not know which is the case. We may have some probability (chance, degree of belief) that the sentence is true; but probability is not a degree of truth.

In metrology (the science of measurement), it is acknowledged that for any measure we care to make, there exists an amount of uncertainty about its accuracy, but this degree of uncertainty is conventionally expressed with a magnitude of likelihood, and not as a degree of truth. In 1975, Lotfi A. Zadeh introduced a distinction between "Type 1 fuzzy sets" without uncertainty and "Type 2 fuzzy sets" with uncertainty, which has been widely accepted. Simply put, in the former case, each fuzzy number is linked to a non-fuzzy (natural) number, while in the latter case, each fuzzy number is linked to another fuzzy number.

== Applications ==
=== Philosophy ===
In philosophical logic and linguistics, fuzzy concepts are often regarded as vague or imprecise ideas which in their application, or strictly speaking, are neither completely true nor completely false. Such ideas require further elaboration, specification or qualification to understand their applicability (the conditions under which they truly make sense). Kit Fine states that "when a philosopher talks of vagueness he has in mind a certain kind of indeterminacy in the relation of something to the world". The "fuzzy area" can also refer simply to a residual number of cases which cannot be allocated to a known and identifiable group, class or set, if strict criteria are used.

The French thinkers Gilles Deleuze and Félix Guattari referred occasionally to fuzzy sets in connection with their phenomenological concept of multiplicities. In A Thousand Plateaus, they state that "a set is fuzzy if its elements belong to it only by virtue of specific operations of consistency and consolidation, which themselves follow a special logic". In their book What Is Philosophy?, which deals with the functions of concepts, they suggest that all philosophical concepts could be regarded as "vague or fuzzy sets, simple aggregates of perceptions and affections, which form within the lived as immanent to a subject, to a consciousness [and which] are qualitative or intensive multiplicities, like "redness" or "baldness," where we cannot decide whether certain elements do or do not belong to the set."

=== Fuzzy logic ===
In mathematics and computer science, the gradations of applicable meaning of a fuzzy concept are described in terms of quantitative relationships defined by logical operators. Such an approach is sometimes called "degree-theoretic semantics" by logicians and philosophers, but the more usual term is fuzzy logic or many-valued logic. The novelty of fuzzy logic is, that it "breaks with the traditional principle that formalisation should correct and avoid, but not compromise with, vagueness". The basic idea of fuzzy set theory is that a real number is assigned to each statement written in a language, within a range from 0 to 1, where 1 means that the statement is completely true, and 0 means that the statement is completely false, while values less than 1 but greater than 0 represent that the statement is "partly true", to a given, quantifiable extent. Susan Haack comments:

"Whereas in classical set theory an object either is or is not a member of a given set, in fuzzy set theory membership is a matter of degree; the degree of membership of an object in a fuzzy set is represented by some real number between 0 and 1, with 0 denoting no membership and 1 full membership."

"Truth" in this mathematical context usually means simply that "something is the case", or that "something is applicable". Fuzzy set theory makes it possible to analyze a distribution of statements for their truth-content or degree of validity, identify data patterns, make inferences and predictions, and model how processes operate. Petr Hájek claimed that "fuzzy logic is not just some "applied logic", but may bring "new light to classical logical problems", and therefore might be well classified as a distinct branch of "philosophical logic" similar to e.g. modal logics. Fuzzy logic does not abolish the "hard and soft science" distinction, but modifies it, by redefining what scientific rigour means in many fields of research.

=== Machinery and analytics ===
Fuzzy logic offers computationally-oriented systems of concepts and methods, to formalize types of reasoning which are ordinarily approximate only, and not exact. In principle, this allows us to give a definite, precise answer to the question, "To what extent is something the case?", or, "To what extent is something applicable?". Via a series of switches, this kind of reasoning can be built into electronic devices. That was already happening before fuzzy logic was invented, but using fuzzy logic in modelling has become an important aid in design, which creates many new technical possibilities. Fuzzy reasoning (i.e., reasoning with graded concepts) turns out to have many practical uses. It is nowadays widely used in:

- The programming of vehicle and transport electronics, household appliances, video games, language filters, robotics, driverless vehicles and spacecraft. Fuzzy logic washing machines are gaining popularity.
- All kinds of control systems that regulate access, traffic, movement, balance, conditions, temperature, pressure, routers etc.
- Electronic equipment used for pattern recognition, surveying and monitoring (including radars, satellites, alarm systems and surveillance systems).
- Cybernetics research, artificial intelligence, virtual intelligence, machine learning, database design and soft computing research.
- "Fuzzy risk scores" are used by project managers and portfolio managers to express financial risk assessments.
- Fuzzy logic has been applied to the problem of predicting cement strength.

It looks like fuzzy logic will eventually be applied in almost every aspect of life, even if people are not aware of it, in that sense fuzzy logic is a successful invention. The scientific and engineering literature on the subject is constantly increasing.

=== Community ===
Originally, a lot of applied research on fuzzy logic systems was done by Japanese pioneers inventing new machinery, electronic equipment and appliances (see also Fuzzy control system). The idea became so popular in Japan, that the English word entered Japanese language (ファジィ概念). "Fuzzy theory" (ファジー理論) is a recognized field in Japanese scientific research.

Since that time, the movement has spread worldwide; nearly every country nowadays has its own fuzzy systems association, although some are larger and more developed than others. In some cases, the local body is a branch of an international one. In other cases, the fuzzy systems program falls under artificial intelligence or soft computing. There are also some emerging networks of researchers which do not yet have their own website. The following list is only provisional and illustrative — many more groups could possibly be added:

- The main international body is the International Fuzzy Systems Association (IFSA).
- The Computational Intelligence Society of the Institute of Electrical and Electronics Engineers, Inc. (IEEE) has an international membership and deals with fuzzy logic, neural networks and evolutionary computing. It publishes the journal IEEE Transactions on Fuzzy Systems and holds international conferences. At the end of 2024, there were 238 chapters of IEEE/CIS across the world.
- The conference on Fuzzy Systems and Data Mining (FSDM) has its 11th International Conference (FSDM2025) in Hanshan Normal University, Chaozhou City, Guangdong Province, China.
- The Asia Pacific Neural Network Society, founded in 1993, has board members from 13 countries: Australia, China, Hong Kong, India, Japan, Malaysia, New Zealand, Singapore, South Korea, Qatar, Taiwan, Thailand, and Turkey.
- The International Association for fuzzy-set management and economy (SIGEF) is based in Spain and publishes the Fuzzy Economic Review since 1996.
- Intelligent and Fuzzy Systems (INFUS) is an international research forum to advance the foundations and applications of intelligent and fuzzy systems, computational intelligence, soft computing for applied research in general, complex engineering and decision support systems.
- The interdisciplinary Japan Society for Fuzzy Theory and Intelligent Informatics (SOFT) traces its origin back to 1972 and publishes two journals.
- The original Korea Fuzzy System Society founded in 1991 is now known as the Korean Institute of Intelligent Systems (KIIS).
- In mainland China, there is the Fuzzy Mathematics and Systems Association of China (FMSAC) based at the School of Mathematics, Sichuan University in Chengdu, and there exists also an important Taiwan Fuzzy Systems Association.
- The North American Fuzzy Information Processing Society (NAFIPS) was founded in 1981. There exists also a Hispanic-American Fuzzy System Association (HAFSA) based in Mexico.
- In Europe, there is a European Society for Fuzzy Logic and Technology (EUSFLAT) which includes the Working Group on Mathematical Fuzzy Logic. The North European Society of Adaptive and Intelligent Systems (NSAIS) is based in Finland.
- In 2002, the Iran Fuzzy Systems Society (nowadays merged into the Iranian Coalition on Soft Computing) was approved as an affiliate of the Statistics Association of Iran, and in 2005 registered as a non-commercial scientific institute. When Lotfi A. Zadeh received an honorary doctorate from the University of Teheran on 9 March 2017, a member of Iran's parliament stated that Iran now ranks third in the world with regard to the output of scientific research about fuzzy systems.
- In 2005, Russia's Association for Fuzzy Systems (founded in January 1990) became the Russian Association for Fuzzy Systems and Soft Computing (RAFSSoftCom). Zadeh's seminal paper on fuzzy sets was translated into Russian in 1974, and subsequently Russian fuzzy research began to take off — increasingly overcoming official skepticism.
- In 2009, the Brazilian Applied Mathematical Society (SBMAC) created the Thematic Committee on Fuzzy Systems which inspired the First Brazilian Congress on Fuzzy Systems (CBSF I) in 2010. CBSF VI was held at São Paulo State University in 2021. There also exists a Brazilian Society of Automatics (SBA).
- In India, the Center for Soft Computing Research at the Indian Statistical Institute (Kolkata) organizes and publishes research on fuzzy sets, rough sets, and applications of fuzzy logic.
- The Sri Lanka Association for Artificial Intelligence is a non-profit scientific association devoted to understanding the mechanisms underlying thoughts and intelligent behaviour, and their emulation in machines.
- Other national scientific bodies include the Hungarian Fuzzy Association (HFA), the Fuzzy Systems Association of Turkey (FSAT), the Indonesian Soft Computing Society (SC-INA), and the Vietnamese Fuzzy Systems Society (VFSS).

=== Achievements ===
Lotfi A. Zadeh estimated around 2014 that there were more than 50,000 fuzzy logic–related, patented inventions. He listed 28 journals at that time dealing with fuzzy reasoning, and 21 journal titles on soft computing. His searches found close to 100,000 publications with the word "fuzzy" in their titles, but perhaps there are even 300,000. In March 2018, Google Scholar found 2,870,000 titles which included the word "fuzzy". When he died on 11 September 2017 at age 96, Professor Zadeh had received more than 50 engineering and academic awards, in recognition of his work.

== Lattices and big data sets ==
The technique of fuzzy concept lattices is increasingly used in programming for the formatting, relating and analysis of fuzzy data sets.

=== Concept formalization ===
According to the computer scientist Andrei Popescu at Middlesex University London, a concept can be operationally defined to consist of:

- an intent, which is a description or specification stated in a language,
- an extent, which is the collection of all the objects to which the description refers,
- a context, which is stated by: (i) the universe of all possible objects within the scope of the concept, (ii) the universe of all possible attributes of objects, and (iii) the logical definition of the relation whereby an object possesses an attribute.

Once the context is defined, we can specify relationships of sets of objects with sets of attributes which they do, or do not share.

=== Fuzzy concept lattice ===
Whether an object belongs to a concept, and whether an object does, or does not have an attribute, can often be a matter of degree. Thus, for example, "many attributes are fuzzy rather than crisp". To overcome this issue, a numerical value is assigned to each attribute along a scale, and the results are placed in a table which links each assigned object-value within the given range to a numerical value (a score) denoting a given degree of applicability.

This is the basic idea of a "fuzzy concept lattice", which can also be graphed; different fuzzy concept lattices can be connected to each other as well (for example, in "fuzzy conceptual clustering" techniques used to group data, originally invented by Enrique H. Ruspini). Fuzzy concept lattices are a useful programming tool for the exploratory analysis of big data, for example in cases where sets of linked behavioural responses are broadly similar, but can nevertheless vary in important ways, within certain limits. It can help to find out what the structure and dimensions are, of a behaviour that occurs with an important but limited amount of variation in a large population.

=== Big data ===
Coding with fuzzy lattices can be useful, for instance, in the psephological analysis of big data about voter behaviour, where researchers want to explore the characteristics and associations involved in "somewhat vague" opinions; gradations in voter attitudes; and variability in voter behaviour (or personal characteristics) within a set of parameters. The basic programming techniques for this kind of fuzzy concept mapping and deep learning are by now well-established and big data analytics had a strong influence on the US elections of 2016. A US study concluded in 2015 that for 20% of undecided voters, Google's proprietary search algorithm had the power to change the way they voted.

Very large quantities of data can now be explored using computers with fuzzy logic programming and open-source architectures such as Apache Hadoop, Apache Spark, and MongoDB. One author claimed in 2016 that it is now possible to obtain, link and analyze "400 data points" for each voter in a population, using Oracle systems (a "data point" is a number linked to one or more categories, which represents a characteristic).

However, NBC News reported in 2016 that the Anglo-American firm Cambridge Analytica which profiled voters for Donald Trump (Steve Bannon was a board member) did not have 400, but 4,000 data points for each of 230 million US adults. Cambridge Analytica's own website claimed that "up to 5,000 data points" were collected for each of 220 million Americans, a data set of more than 1 trillion bits of formatted data. The Guardian later claimed that Cambridge Analytica in fact had, according to its own company information, "up to 7,000 data points" on 240 million American voters.

Harvard University Professor Latanya Sweeney calculated, that if a U.S. company knows just your date of birth, your ZIP code and sex, the company has an 87% chance to identify you by name – simply by using linked data sets from various sources. With 4,000–7,000 data points instead of three, a very comprehensive personal profile becomes possible for almost every voter, and many behavioural patterns can be inferred by linking together different data sets. It also becomes possible to identify and measure gradations in personal characteristics which, in aggregate, have very large effects. It creates huge power for the corporations, governments and military forces who control the new technology.

== Human judgement ==
Some researchers argue that this kind of big data analysis has severe limitations, and that the analytical results can only be regarded as indicative, and not as definitive. This was confirmed by Kellyanne Conway, Donald Trump's campaign advisor and counselor in 2016, who emphasized the importance of human judgement and common sense in drawing conclusions from fuzzy data. Conway stated candidly that much of her own research would "never see the light of day", because it was client confidential. Another Trump adviser criticized Conway, claiming that she "produces an analysis that buries every terrible number and highlights every positive number"

=== Propaganda machine ===
In a video interview published by The Guardian in March 2018, whistleblower Christopher Wylie called Cambridge Analytica a "full-service propaganda machine" rather than a bona fide data science company. Its own site revealed with "case studies" that it had been active in political campaigns in numerous different countries, influencing attitudes and opinions. Wylie explained, that "we spent a million dollars harvesting tens of millions of Facebook profiles, and those profiles were used as the basis of the algorithms that became the foundation of Cambridge Analytica itself. The company itself was founded on using Facebook data".

=== Audit ===
On 19 March 2018, Facebook announced it had hired the digital forensics firm Stroz Friedberg to conduct a "comprehensive audit" of Cambridge Analytica, while Facebook shares plummeted 7 percent overnight (erasing roughly $40 billion in market capitalization). Cambridge Analytica had not just used the profiles of Facebook users to compile data sets. According to Christopher Wylie's testimony, the company also harvested the data of each user's network of friends, leveraging the original data set. It then converted, combined and migrated its results into new data sets, which can in principle survive in some format, even if the original data sources are destroyed. It created and applied algorithms using data to which — critics argue — it could not have been entitled. This was denied by Cambridge Analytica, which stated on its website that it legitimately "uses data to change audience behavior" among customers and voters (who choose to view and provide information). If advertisers can do that, why not a data company? Where should the line be drawn? Legally, it remained a "fuzzy" area.

=== Legal issue ===
The tricky legal issue then became, what kind of data Cambridge Analytica (or any similar company) is actually allowed to have and keep. Facebook itself became the subject of another U.S. Federal Trade Commission inquiry, to establish whether Facebook violated the terms of a 2011 consent decree governing its handing of user data (data which was allegedly transferred to Cambridge Analytica without Facebook's and user's knowledge). Wired journalist Jessi Hempel commented in a CBNC panel discussion that "Now there is this fuzziness from the top of the company [i.e. Facebook] that I have never seen in the fifteen years that I have covered it."

=== Data privacy ===
Interrogating Facebook's CEO Mark Zuckerberg before the U.S. House Energy and Commerce Committee in April 2018, New Mexico Congressman Rep. Ben Ray Luján put it to him that the Facebook corporation might well have "29,000 data points" on each Facebook user. Mark Zuckerberg claimed that he "did not really know". Lujan's figure was based on ProPublica research, which in fact suggested that Facebook may even have 52,000 data points for many Facebook users. When Mark Zuckerberg replied to his critics, he stated that because the revolutionary technology of Facebook (with 2.2 billion users worldwide, at that time) had ventured into previously unknown territory, it was unavoidable that mistakes would be made, despite the best of intentions. He justified himself saying that:

"For the first ten or twelve years of the company, I viewed our responsibility primarily as building tools, that if we could put those tools in people's hands, then that would empower people to do good things. What we have learnt now... is that we need to take a more proactive role and a broader view of our responsibility."

The suggestion is that building digital network services such as Facebook could be likened to raising a child. The child has been created, it needs to be raised, but not everything that is needed for that is known in advance. It has to be worked out through the experience of raising the child, and in the interactions with the child.

=== Integrity ===
It remained "fuzzy" what was more important to Mark Zuckerberg: making money from user's information, or real corporate integrity in the use of personal information. Zuckerberg implied, that he believed that, on balance, Facebook had done more good than harm, and that, if he had believed that wasn't the case, he would never have persevered with the business. Thus, "the good" was itself a fuzzy concept, because it was a matter of degree ("much more good than bad", as indicated by the fact that more than 2 billion people stay signed up with Facebook). He had to sell stuff, to pay the bills, finance development and keep the business growing. If people do not like Facebook, then they simply should not join it, or opt out, they have the choice.

Many critics however feel that people really are in no position to make an informed choice about joining Facebook, because they have no idea of how exactly their information will or might be used by third parties contracting with Facebook; because the company legally owns the information that users provide online, they have no control over that either, except to restrict themselves in what they write online; the same applies to many other online services (see further Facebook–Cambridge Analytica data scandal).

After the New York Times broke the news on 17 March 2018, that copies of the Facebook data set scraped by Cambridge Analytica could still be downloaded from the Internet, Facebook was severely criticized by government representatives. When questioned, Mark Zuckerberg admitted that "In general we collect data on people who are not signed up for Facebook for security purposes" with the aim "to help prevent malicious actors from collecting public information from Facebook users, such as names". Where the privacy boundary was drawn, was somewhat fuzzy.

On 2 May 2018, it was reported that the Cambridge Analytica company was shutting down and was starting bankruptcy proceedings, after losing clients and facing escalating legal costs. The reputational damage which the company had suffered or caused, had become too great.

In July 2018, Facebook and Instagram barred access from Crimson Hexagon, a company that advises corporations and governments using one trillion scraped social media posts, which it mined and processed with artificial intelligence and image analysis.

From 2018 onward, Facebook faced a lot more lawsuits brought against the company, alleging data breaches, security breaches and misuse of personal information (see Lawsuits involving Meta Platforms and Facebook Federal Litigation Filings). In November 2023, Meta Platforms was reported to be a defendant or co-defendant in at least 2,100 lawsuits. Annual lawsuit filings by and against Meta Platforms end up costing millions of dollars and even more; the cumulative legal costs run into billions of dollars. This creates a powerful financial incentive to get the company systems working right and neutralize malafide online operators. There still doesn't exist a standard international regulatory framework for social network information, and it is often unclear what happens to the stored information, after a provider company closes down, or is taken over by another company. Mark Zuckerberg's Meta company also reports its own legal actions. In 2023, Meta Platforms sued the Israeli company Bright Data, a former business partner, for scraping a large data set from Facebook and Instagram and selling it for profit. Included were 615 million records of Instagram data, sold for $860,000, with “users’ names, IDs, country, post counts, bios, hashtags, followers, posts, profile images, business categories, emails, and more”. Meta lost the case.

On 16 July 2025, a non-jury 8-day trial commenced in Wilmington before Kathaleen McCormick, the chief judge of the Delaware Chancery Court, against Mark Zuckerberg and former Meta directors. In this case, a group of Meta shareholders (including individual investors and pension funds such as the California State Teachers' Retirement System) alleged that, during and after the Cambridge Analytica scandal, the Meta directors failed badly in their duty of oversight, initiated deceptive privacy procedures, and had flouted the 2012 agreement with the Federal Trade Commission to protect users' data. Mark Zuckerberg and Sheryl Sandberg were also alleged to have knowingly caused the company to violate US law. It was furthermore alleged that as soon as Mark Zuckerberg knew that the Cambridge Analytica scandal was about to go public, and would cause the company's stock value to fall, he had offloaded a large parcel of Meta shares and made a huge personal profit. The plaintiffs in this case wanted the defendants (including Mark Zuckerberg, Sheryl Sandberg, Marc Andreessen, Peter Thiel, and Reed Hastings) to personally reimburse the Meta company for more than $8 billion in fines and other costs paid by the company after the Cambridge Analytica scandal, including a $5 billion fine imposed on Facebook by the Federal Trade Commission in 2019, for violating the 2012 agreement. On 17 July 2025, however, the 11 defendants and the plaintiffs agreed to settle the dispute out of court for an undisclosed sum, to be transferred to the company account of Meta Platforms. Meta directors and officers were insured for the costs. Reportedly settlement talks had already proceeded for months, and were concluded after the first day of the trial. The terms of the settlement will be filed with the Delaware Court of Chancery. Since the case was settled out of court, many historical details about the actions of Meta directors will not be disclosed.

=== Data centers and military use ===
An objection to big data is that it cannot cope with rapid change: events move faster that the statistics can keep up. Yet, the technology now exists for corporations like Amazon, Google, Apple Inc. and Microsoft to upload data from app-users in real time straight into big data analytics programmes. Large corporate data centers are being built in many different locations with enormous processing power (see also high-performance fuzzy computing). Provided that the proper analysis is done, it is now possible to draw conclusions about human and natural behaviour using large fuzzy data sets and fuzzy programming – and it can be done increasing speeds.

This achievement has become highly topical in military technology, in areas such as cybersecurity; tracking and monitoring systems; guidance systems (for firearms, explosive launchers, vehicles, planes, vessels, artillery, missiles, satellites, drones and bombs); threat identification/evaluation systems; risk and strategy appraisal; arms transfer and arms race impact assessments; digital face recognition systems, surveillance and crowd control; social network analysis and predictive policing strategies; and a variety of targeting methodologies. The identification of a threat and the response to it often have to happen very fast, with a high degree of accuracy, for which comprehensive artificial intelligence is essential. Dr Tal Mimran, a lecturer at Hebrew University in Jerusalem and a former legal adviser to the Israeli Defence Force (IDF) stated in December 2024 that

"During the period in which I served in the target room [between 2010 and 2015], you needed a team of around 20 intelligence officers to work for around 250 days to gather something between 200 to 250 targets. Today, the AI will do that in a week.”

Although no comprehensive overviews appear to be publicly available, a large amount of scientific research on fuzzy systems was funded or sponsored by the military. However, military uses of fuzzy systems research can also have spin-offs for medical applications.

== Academic debates ==
There have been many academic debates about the meaning, relevance and utility of fuzzy concepts, as well as their appropriate use. Rudolf E. Kálmán stated in 1972 that "there is no such thing as a fuzzy concept... We do talk about fuzzy things but they are not scientific concepts". The suggestion is that to qualify as a concept, the concept must always be clear and precise, without any fuzziness. A vague notion would be at best a prologue to formulating a concept. Nevertheless, "Ever since the introduction of fuzzy sets by L. A. Zadeh, the fuzzy concept has invaded almost all branches of mathematics". In 2011, three Chinese engineers alleged that "Fuzzy set, its t-norm, s-norm and fuzzy supplement theories have already become the academic virus in the world".

=== "Fuzzy" label ===
Lotfi A. Zadeh himself confessed that:

"I knew that just by choosing the label fuzzy I was going to find myself in the midst of a controversy... If it weren't called fuzzy logic, there probably wouldn't be articles on it on the front page of the New York Times. So let us say it has a certain publicity value. Of course, many people don't like that publicity value, and when they see it in the New York Times, it doesn't sit well with them."

However, the impact of the invention of fuzzy reasoning went far beyond names and labels. When Zadeh gave his acceptance speech in Japan for the 1989 Honda Foundation prize, which he received for inventing fuzzy theory, he stated that "The concept of a fuzzy set has had an upsetting effect on the established order."

=== Frege and Wittgenstein ===
According to The Foundations of Arithmetic by the logician Gottlob Frege,

"A definition of a concept... must be complete; it must unambiguously determine, as regards any object, whether or not it falls under the concept... the concept must have a sharp boundary... a concept that is not sharply defined is wrongly termed a concept. Such quasi-conceptual constructions cannot be recognized as concepts by logic. The law of the excluded middle is really just another form of the requirement that the concept should have a sharp boundary."

In his notes on language games, Ludwig Wittgenstein replied to Frege's argument as follows:

"One can say that the concept of a game is a concept with blurred edges. “But is a blurred concept a concept at all?” Is a photograph that is not sharp a picture of a person at all? Is it even always an advantage to replace a picture that is not sharp by one that is? Isn’t one that isn’t sharp often just what we need? Frege compares a concept to a region, and says that a region without clear boundaries can’t be called a region at all. This presumably means that we can’t do anything with it. But is it senseless to say “Stay roughly here”? Imagine that I were standing with someone in a city square and said that. As I say it, I do not bother drawing any boundary, but just make a pointing gesture as if I were indicating a particular spot. And this is just how one might explain what a game is."

=== The categorical status of concepts ===
There is no general agreement among philosophers and scientists about how the notion of a "concept" (and in particular, a scientific concept), should be defined. A concept could be defined as a mental representation, as a cognitive capacity, as an abstract object, as a cluster of linked phenomena etc. Edward E. Smith & Douglas L. Medin stated that "there will likely be no crucial experiments or analyses that will establish one view of concepts as correct and rule out all others irrevocably." Of course, scientists also quite often do use imprecise analogies in their models to help understanding an issue. A concept can be clear enough, but not (or not sufficiently) precise.

Terminology scientists at the German National Standards Institute (Deutsches Institut für Normung) provided the first official standard definition of what a concept is (in the terminology standard DIN 2330 of 1957, revised in 1974 and last revised in 2022). According to DIN 2330, a concept is "a unit of thought formed by abstraction from a set of objects by identifying their common characteristics". According to the ISO 1087 terminology standard of the International Organization for Standardization, a concept is defined as “a unit of knowledge created by a unique combination of characteristics”. A concept is regarded as language-independent, and exists independently of how exactly it is symbolized or referred to in natural language. Individual concepts refer to a single object or instance. General concepts refer to a class of objects with shared characteristics. The ISO 704 standard adds that a concept as a unit of thought comprises two parts: its extent and its intent. The extent comprises all objects belonging to the concept, and the intent comprises all attributes shared by those objects. Different standard definitions and terminologies for concepts exist for various systems in cyberspace.

The official terminological standards are useful for many practical purposes. But for more complex concepts, the standards may not be so helpful. The reason is that complex concepts do not necessarily denote only a collection of objects which have something in common. A complex concept may for example express a Gestalt, i.e. it may express a totality which is more, does more and means more, than the sum of its parts (as recognized in Aristotle's Metaphysics). It may be that the parts cannot exist other than within the totality. The totality could also be a "totality of totalities". In such cases, the definition of the complex concept is not (or not fully) reducible to what its parts have in common. Modelling such a concept requires more than identifying and enumerating the parts that are included in (and excluded from) the concept. It requires also a specification of what all the parts together "add up to", or what they constitute collectively. In some respects at least, the totality differs qualitatively from any of its parts. The Gestalt could be a fuzzy object, figure or shape.

=== Potential corruption ===
Reasoning with fuzzy concepts is often viewed as a kind of "logical corruption" or scientific perversion because, it is claimed, fuzzy reasoning rarely reaches a definite "yes" or a definite "no". A clear, precise and logically rigorous conceptualization is no longer a necessary prerequisite, for carrying out a procedure, a project, or an inquiry, since "somewhat vague ideas" can always be accommodated, formalized and programmed with the aid of fuzzy expressions. The purist idea is, that either a rule applies, or it does not apply. When a rule is said to apply only "to some extent", then in truth the rule does not apply. Thus, a compromise with vagueness or indefiniteness is, on this view, effectively a compromise with error — an error of conceptualization, an error in the inferential system, or an error in physically carrying out a task.

The computer scientist William Kahan warned in 1975 that "the danger of fuzzy theory is that it will encourage the sort of imprecise thinking that has brought us so much trouble." He said subsequently,

"With traditional logic there is no guaranteed way to find that something is contradictory, but once it is found, you'd be obliged to do something. But with fuzzy sets, the existence of contradictory sets can't cause things to malfunction. Contradictory information doesn't lead to a clash. You just keep computing. (...) Life affords many instances of getting the right answer for the wrong reasons... It is in the nature of logic to confirm or deny. The fuzzy calculus blurs that. (...) Logic isn't following the rules of Aristotle blindly. It takes the kind of pain known to the runner. He knows he is doing something. When you are thinking about something hard, you'll feel a similar sort of pain. Fuzzy logic is marvellous. It insulates you from pain. It's the cocaine of science."

According to Kahan, statements of a degree of probability are usually verifiable. There are standard statistical tests one can do. By contrast, there is no conclusive procedure which can decide the validity of assigning particular fuzzy truth values to a data set in the first instance. It is just assumed that a model or program will work, "if" particular fuzzy values are accepted and used, perhaps based on some statistical comparisons or try-outs.

==== Bad design ====
In programming, a problem can usually be solved in several different ways, not just one way, but an important issue is, which solution works best in the short term, and in the long term. Kahan implies, that fuzzy solutions may create more problems in the long term, than they solve in the short term. For example, if one starts off designing a procedure, not with well thought-out, precise concepts, but rather by using fuzzy or approximate expressions which conveniently patch up (or compensate for) badly formulated ideas, the ultimate result could be a complicated, malformed mess, that does not achieve the intended goal.

Had the reasoning and conceptualization been much sharper at the start, then the design of the procedure might have been much simpler, more efficient and effective — and fuzzy expressions or approximations would not be necessary, or required much less. Thus, by allowing the use of fuzzy or approximate expressions, one might actually foreclose more rigorous thinking about design, and one might build something that ultimately does not meet expectations.

If (say) an entity X turns out to belong for 65% to category Y, and for 35% to category Z, how should X be allocated? One could plausibly decide to allocate X to Y, making a rule that, if an entity belongs for 65% or more to Y, it is to be treated as an instance of category Y, and never as an instance of category Z. One could, however, alternatively decide to change the definitions of the categorization system, to ensure that all entities such as X fall 100% in one category only.

This kind of argument claims, that boundary problems can be resolved (or vastly reduced) simply by using better categorization or conceptualization methods. If we treat X "as if" it belongs 100% to Y, while in truth it only belongs 65% to Y, then arguably we are really misrepresenting things. If we keep doing that with a lot of related variables, we can greatly distort the true situation, and make it look like something that it isn't.

In a "fuzzy permissive" environment, it might become far too easy, to formalize and use a concept which is itself badly defined, and which could have been defined much better. In that environment, there is always a quantitative way out, for concepts that do not quite fit, or which don't quite do the job for which they are intended. The cumulative adverse effect of the discrepancies might, in the end, be much larger than ever anticipated.

==== Counter-argument ====
A typical reply to Kahan's objections is, that fuzzy reasoning never "rules out" ordinary binary logic, but instead presupposes ordinary true-or-false logic. Lotfi Zadeh stated that "fuzzy logic is not fuzzy. In large measure, fuzzy logic is precise." It is a precise logic of imprecision. Fuzzy logic is not a replacement of, or substitute for ordinary logic, but an enhancement of it, with many practical uses. Fuzzy thinking does oblige action, but primarily in response to a change in quantitative gradation, not in response to a contradiction.

One could say, for example, that ultimately one is either "alive" or "dead", which is perfectly true. Meantime though one is "living", which is also a significant truth — yet "living" is a fuzzy concept. It is true that fuzzy logic by itself usually cannot eliminate inadequate conceptualization or bad design. Yet it can at least make explicit, what exactly the variations are in the applicability of a concept which has unsharp boundaries.

If one always had perfectly crisp concepts available, perhaps no fuzzy expressions would be necessary. In reality though, one often does not have all the crisp concepts to start off with. One might not have them yet for a long time, or ever — or, several successive "fuzzy" approximations might be needed, to get there. A "fuzzy permissive" environment may be appropriate and useful, precisely because it permits things to be actioned, that would never have been achieved, if there had been crystal clarity about all the consequences from the start, or if people insisted on absolute precision prior to doing anything. Scientists often try things out on the basis of "hunches", and processes like serendipity can play a role.

Learning something new, or trying to create something new, is rarely a completely formal-logical or linear process. There are not only "knowns" and "unknowns" involved, but also "partly known" phenomena, i.e., things which are known or unknown "to some degree". Even if, ideally, we would prefer to eliminate fuzzy ideas, we might need them initially to get there, further down the track. Any method of reasoning is a tool. If its application has bad results, it is not the tool itself that is to blame, but its inappropriate use. It would be better to educate people in the best use of the tool, if necessary with appropriate authorization, than to ban the tool pre-emptively, on the ground that it "could" or "might" be abused.

Exceptions to this rule would include things like computer viruses and illegal weapons that can only cause great harm if they are used. The US Food and Drug Administration and the European Food Safety Authority for example ban the use of certain foodstuffs, drugs and medicines completely, on the basis of scientific evidence, or restrict their use. There is no evidence though that fuzzy concepts as a species are intrinsically harmful or evil, even if some bad concepts can cause harm — if used in inappropriate contexts. There are no laws against (say) the possession of a hammer, even though a hammer could be used to hurt or kill people. Instead, the use of a hammer to cause harm can be prosecuted in civilized society, according to the criminal code. If the possession and use of hammers was banned altogether, then carpenters and mechanics would not be able to do their job, and many industries would break down — unless perhaps a new piece of safe machinery could be used as an alternative for hammers.

The peaceful use of drones (which may involve fuzzy logic technologies) is generally accepted, except if drones interfere with traffic, contravene privacy or residents rights, or violate police orders or military decrees. A drone strike that intentionally targets civilians in a war, or that is indiscriminate or disproportionate, is unlawful under International Humanitarian Law. No government has publicly admitted to using a fuzzy-logic engine in a war zone which autonomously chooses drone or missile targets, or firing weapons based on a fuzzy rule set without human approval. But in practice there are risks, because such technology can be used, and the combatants may not stick to legal norms. What really happens on the battlefield, or in a command centre, may be difficult to audit for legal compliance. There may also be unpredictable interactions between different rules applicable on the battlefield. Certain uses of weapons are difficult to verify/validate for safety certification. So the definition of what actually happened may be fuzzy. An example is a new loitering munition, the V2U drone developed by the Russian armed forces.

=== Reducibility ===
Susan Haack once claimed that a many-valued logic requires neither intermediate terms between true and false, nor a rejection of bivalence. She implied that the intermediate terms (i.e. the gradations of truth) can always be restated as conditional if-then statements, and by implication, that fuzzy logic is fully reducible to binary true-or-false logic.

This interpretation is disputed (it assumes that the knowledge already exists to fit the intermediate terms to a logical sequence), but even if it was correct, assigning a number to the applicability of a statement is often enormously more efficient than a long string of if-then statements that would have the same intended meaning. That point is obviously of great importance to computer programmers, educators and administrators seeking to code a process, activity, message or operation as simply as possible, according to logically consistent rules. Prof. Haack is, of course, quite correct when she argues that fuzzy logic does not do away with binary logic.

=== Quantification ===
It may be wonderful to have an unlimited number of distinctions available to define what one means, but not all scholars would agree that any concept is equal to, or reducible to, a mathematical set. Some phenomena are difficult or impossible to quantify and count, in particular if they lack discrete boundaries (for example, clouds). George Lakoff emphasized that it is not true that fuzzy-set theory is the only or necessarily the most appropriate way to start modelling concepts.

==== Formalization ====
Qualities may not be fully reducible to quantities – if there are no qualities, it may become impossible to say what the numbers are numbers of, or what they refer to, except that they refer to other numbers or numerical expressions such as algebraic equations. A measure requires a counting unit defined by a category, but the definition of that category is essentially qualitative; a language which is used to communicate data is difficult to operate, without any qualitative distinctions and categories. We may, for example, transmit a text in binary code, but the binary code does not tell us directly what the text intends. It has to be translated, decoded or converted first, before it becomes comprehensible.

In creating a formalization or formal specification of a concept, for example for the purpose of measurement, administrative procedure or programming, part of the meaning of the concept may be changed or lost. For example, if we deliberately program an event according to a concept, it might kill off the spontaneity, spirit, authenticity and motivational pattern which is ordinarily associated with that type of event.

Quantification is not an unproblematic process. To quantify a phenomenon, we may have to introduce special assumptions and definitions which disregard part of totality of the phenomenon.

- The economist John Maynard Keynes concluded that formalization "runs the risk of leaving behind the subjectmatter we are interested in" and "also runs the risk of increasing rather than decreasing the muddle."
- Friedrich Hayek stated that "it is certainly not scientific to insist on measurement where you don't know what your measurements mean. There are cases where measurements are not relevant."
- The Hayekian big data guru Viktor Mayer-Schönberger states that "A system based on money and price solved a problem of too much information and not enough processing power, but in the process of distilling information down to price, many details get lost."
- Michael Polanyi stated that "the process of formalizing all knowledge to the exclusion of any tacit knowing is self-defeating", since to mathematize a concept we need to be able to identify it in the first instance without mathematization.

==== Measurement ====
Programmers, statisticians or logicians are concerned in their work with the main operational or technical significance of a concept which is specifiable in objective, quantifiable terms. They are not primarily concerned with all kinds of imaginative frameworks associated with the concept, or with those aspects of the concept which seem to have no particular functional purpose – however entertaining they might be. However, some of the qualitative characteristics of the concept may not be quantifiable or measurable at all, at least not directly. The temptation exists to ignore them, or try to infer them from data results.

If, for example, we want to count the number of trees in a forest area with any precision, we have to define what counts as one tree, and perhaps distinguish them from saplings, split trees, dead trees, fallen trees etc. Soon enough it becomes apparent that the quantification of trees involves a degree of abstraction – we decide to disregard some timber, dead or alive, from the population of trees, in order to count those trees that conform to our chosen concept of a tree. We operate in fact with an abstract concept of what a tree is, which diverges to some extent from the true diversity of trees there are.

Even so, there may be some trees, of which it is not very clear, whether they should be counted as a tree or not. It may be difficult to define the exact boundary where the forest begins and ends. The forest boundary might also change somewhat in the course of time. A certain amount of "fuzziness" in the definition of a tree and of the forest may therefore remain. The implication is, that the seemingly "exact" number offered for the total quantity of trees in the forest may be much less exact than one might think — it is probably more an estimate or indication of magnitude, rather than an exact description. Yet — and this is the point — the imprecise measure can be very useful and sufficient for all intended purposes.

It is tempting to think, that if something can be measured, it must exist, and that if we cannot measure it, it does not exist. Neither might be true. Researchers try to measure such things as intelligence or gross domestic product, without much scientific agreement about what these things actually are, how they exist, and what the correct measures might be.

When one wants to count and quantify distinct objects using numbers, one needs to be able to distinguish between all of those separate objects as countable units. If this is difficult or impossible, then, although this may not invalidate a quantitative procedure as such, quantification is not really possible in practice. At best, we may be able to assume or infer indirectly a certain distribution of quantities that must be there. In this sense, scientists often use proxy variables to substitute as measures for variables which are known (or thought) to be there, but which themselves cannot be observed or measured directly.

=== Vague or fuzzy ===
The exact relationship between vagueness and fuzziness is disputed.

==== Philosophical interpretation ====
Philosophers often regard fuzziness as a particular kind of vagueness, and consider that "no specific assignment of semantic values to vague predicates, not even a fuzzy one, can fully satisfy our conception of what the extensions of vague predicates are like". Surveying recent literature on how to characterize vagueness, Matti Eklund states that appeal to lack of sharp boundaries, borderline cases and "sorites-susceptible" predicates are the three informal characterizations of vagueness which are most common in the literature.

==== Zadeh's argument ====
However, Lotfi A. Zadeh claimed that "vagueness connotes insufficient specificity, whereas fuzziness connotes unsharpness of class boundaries". Thus, he argued, a sentence like "I will be back in a few minutes" is fuzzy but not vague, whereas a sentence such as "I will be back sometime", is fuzzy and vague. His suggestion was that fuzziness and vagueness are logically quite different qualities, rather than fuzziness being a type or subcategory of vagueness. Zadeh claimed that "inappropriate use of the term 'vague' is still a common practice in the literature of philosophy".

=== Ethics and law ===
In the scholarly inquiry about ethics and meta-ethics, vague or fuzzy concepts and borderline cases are standard topics of controversy. Central to ethics are theories of "value", what is "good" or "bad" for people and why that is, and the idea of "rule following" as a condition for moral integrity, consistency and non-arbitrary behaviour.

Yet, if human valuations or moral rules are only vague or fuzzy, then they may not be able to orient or guide behaviour. It may become impossible to operationalize rules. Evaluations may not permit definite moral judgements, in that case. Hence, clarifying fuzzy moral notions is usually considered to be critical for the ethical endeavour as a whole.

==== Excessive precision in rule-making ====
Nevertheless, Scott Soames has made the case that vagueness or fuzziness can be valuable to rule-makers, because "their use of it is valuable to the people to whom rules are addressed". It may be more practical and effective to allow for some leeway (and personal responsibility) in the interpretation of how a rule should be applied — bearing in mind the overall purpose which the rule intends to achieve.

If a rule or procedure is stipulated too exactly, it can sometimes have a result which is contrary to the aim which it was intended to help achieve. For example, "The Children and Young Persons Act could have specified a precise age below which a child may not be left unsupervised. But doing so would have incurred quite substantial forms of arbitrariness (for various reasons, and particularly because of the different capacities of children of the same age)".

==== Conflicting rules ====
A related sort of problem is, that if the application of a legal concept is pursued too exactly and rigorously, it may have consequences that cause a serious conflict with another legal concept. This is not necessarily a matter of bad law-making. When a law is made, it may not be possible to anticipate all the cases and events to which it will apply later (even if 95% of possible cases are predictable). The longer a law is in force, the more likely it is, that people will run into problems with it, that were not foreseen when the law was made.

So, the further implications of one rule may conflict with another rule. "Common sense" might not be able to resolve things. In that scenario, too much precision can get in the way of justice. Very likely a special court ruling wil have to set a norm. The general problem for jurists is, whether "the arbitrariness resulting from precision is worse than the arbitrariness resulting from the application of a vague standard". David Lanius has examined nine arguments for the "value of vagueness" in different contexts.

=== Mathematical ontology ===
The definitional disputes about fuzziness remain unresolved so far, mainly because, as anthropologists and psychologists have documented, different languages (or symbol systems) that have been created by people to signal meanings suggest different ontologies.

Put simply: it is not merely that describing "what is there" involves symbolic representations of some kind. How distinctions are drawn, influences perceptions of "what is there", and vice versa, perceptions of "what is there" influence how distinctions are drawn. This is an important reason why, as Alfred Korzybski noted, people frequently confuse the symbolic representation of reality, conveyed by languages and signs, with reality itself.

For example, watching the TV news, the human brain spontaneously assumes that the TV images being shown are the same as what the TV viewers would see themselves, if they had been physically on the same scene at the same moment – even when the viewers don't have access to everything that exists or happens external to the image frame shown. In this way, the TV image shapes the meaning of what there is, and it does so for most viewers at the same time. A common saying is "seeing is believing", but "believing is seeing" could also be a reality to a certain extent.

Fuzziness implies, that there exists a potentially infinite number of truth values between complete truth and complete falsehood (the endpoints of a scale). If that is the case, it creates the foundational issue of what, in the case, can justify or prove the existence of the categorical absolutes which are assumed by logical or quantitative inference. If there is an infinite number of shades of grey, how do we know what is totally black and white, and how could we identify that? How do we reach the endpoints of the scale?

==== Tegmark's mathematical universe ====
To illustrate the ontological issues, cosmologist Max Tegmark argues boldly that the universe consists of math: "If you accept the idea that both space itself, and all the stuff in space, have no properties at all except mathematical properties," then the idea that everything is mathematical "starts to sound a little bit less insane."

Tegmark moves from the epistemic claim that mathematics is the only known symbol system which can in principle express absolutely everything, to the methodological claim that everything is reducible to mathematical relationships, and then to the ontological claim, that ultimately everything that exists is mathematical (the mathematical universe hypothesis). The argument is then reversed, so that because everything is mathematical in reality, mathematics is necessarily the ultimate universal symbol system.

The main criticisms of Tegmark's approach are that (1) the steps in this argument do not necessarily follow, (2) no conclusive proof or test is possible for the claim that a total reduction of everything to mathematics is feasible, among other things because qualitative categories remain indispensable to understand and navigate what quantities mean, and (3) it may be that a complete reduction to mathematics cannot be accomplished, without at least partly altering, negating or deleting a non-mathematical significance of phenomena, experienced perhaps as qualia. An additional complication is that mathematical theory is not something fixed and final, like a pancake which is served up, anymore than language is a finished, unchangeable system. Mathematical theory and language are ways of understanding the world which keep developing and changing, in response to new discoveries (without certainty about what the future could bring).

==== Zalta's metaphysics ====
In his meta-mathematical metaphysics, Edward N. Zalta has claimed that for every set of properties of a concrete object, there always exists exactly one abstract object that encodes exactly that set of properties and no others — a foundational assumption or axiom for his ontology of abstract objects By implication, for every fuzzy object there would always exist at least one defuzzified concept which encodes it exactly. It is a modern interpretation of Plato's metaphysics of knowledge, which expresses confidence in the ability of science to conceptualize the world exactly. However, such a theory — like any metaphysical theory — is impossible to test definitively. According to the Dutch computational linguist Kees van Deemter, "The fact that vagueness abounds in the presentation of mathematical results suggests that vagueness plays an important role in our thinking, even when the concepts about which we think are completely crisp."

==== Platonism versus cognitive realism ====
The Platonic-style interpretation of concepts was critiqued by Hartry H. Field. Mark Balaguer argues that we do not really know whether mind-independent abstract objects exist or not; so far, we cannot prove whether Platonic realism is definitely true or false. Defending a cognitive realism, Scott Soames argues that the reason why this unsolvable conundrum has persisted, is because the ultimate constitution of the meaning of concepts and propositions was misconceived.

Traditionally, it was thought that concepts can be truly representational, because ultimately they are related to intrinsically representational Platonic complexes of universals and particulars (see theory of forms). However, once concepts and propositions are regarded as cognitive-event types, it is possible to claim that they are able to be representational, because they are constitutively related to intrinsically representational cognitive acts in the real world. As another philosopher put it,

"The question of how we can know the world around us is not entirely unlike the question of how it is that the food our environment provides happens to agree with our stomachs. Either can become a mystery if we forget that minds, like stomachs, originated in and have been conditioned by a pre-existent natural order."

The idea here is, that we can know the world and represent it realistically, because we are ourselves part of the world and within the world. Along these lines, it could be argued that reality, and the human cognition of reality, will inevitably contain some fuzzy characteristics, which can perhaps be represented only by concepts which are themselves fuzzy to some or other extent. Hongxing Li et al. comment that:

"Fuzzy concepts derive from fuzzy phenomena that commonly occur in the natural world. The concepts formed in human brains for perceiving, recognizing, and categorizing natural phenomena are often fuzzy concepts. Boundaries of these concepts are vague. (…) For example, “rain” is a common natural phenomenon that is difficult to describe precisely since it can “rain” with varying intensity anywhere from a light sprinkle to a torrential downpour. (…) The concepts formed in human brains for perceiving, recognizing, and categorizing natural phenomena are often fuzzy. (...) If it is raining today, you can call it light rain, or moderate rain, or heavy rain based on the relative amount of rainfall: This is fuzzy judging. If you are predicting a good, fair, or poor harvest based on the results of fuzzy judging, you are using fuzzy reasoning. The human brain has the incredible ability of processing fuzzy classification, fuzzy judgment, and fuzzy reasoning. The natural languages are ingeniously permeated with inherent fuzziness so that we can express rich information content in a few words."

=== Paradoxes ===
Even using ordinary set theory and binary logic to reason something out, logicians have discovered that it is possible to generate statements which are logically speaking not completely true or imply a paradox, even although in other respects they conform to logical rules (see Russell's paradox). If a margin of indeterminacy therefore persists, then binary logic cannot totally remove fuzziness. David Hilbert concluded that the existence of logical paradoxes tells us "that we must develop a meta-mathematical analysis of the notions of proof and of the axiomatic method; their importance is methodological as well as epistemological".

== Social science and the media ==
The idea of fuzzy concepts has also been applied in the linguistic, economic and sociological analysis of human behaviour.

=== Sociology and linguistics ===
In a 1973 paper, George Lakoff analyzed hedges in the interpretation of the meaning of categories. Charles Ragin and others have applied the idea to sociological analysis. For example, fuzzy set qualitative comparative analysis ("fsQCA") has been used by German researchers to study problems posed by ethnic diversity in Latin America. In New Zealand, Taiwan, Iran, Malaysia, the European Union and Croatia, economists have used fuzzy concepts to model and measure the underground economy of their country. Kofi Kissi Dompere applied methods of fuzzy decision, approximate reasoning, negotiation games and fuzzy mathematics to analyze the role of money, information and resources in a "political economy of rent-seeking", viewed as a game played between powerful corporations and the government. The German researcher Thomas Kron has used fuzzy methods to model sociological theory, creating an integral action-theoretical model with the aid of fuzzy logic. With Lars Winter, Kron developed the system theory of Niklas Luhmann further, using the so-called "Kosko-Cube". Kron studies transnational terrorism and other contemporary phenomena using fuzzy logic, to understand conditions involving uncertainty, hybridity, violence and cultural systems.

A concept may be deliberately created by sociologists as an ideal type to understand something imaginatively, without any strong claim that it is a "true and complete description" or a "true and complete reflection" of whatever is being conceptualized. In a more general sociological or journalistic sense, a "fuzzy concept" has come to mean a concept which is meaningful but inexact, implying that it does not exhaustively or completely define the meaning of the phenomenon to which it refers – often because it is too abstract. In this context, it is said that fuzzy concepts "lack clarity and are difficult to test or operationalize". To specify the relevant meaning more precisely, additional distinctions, conditions and/or qualifiers would be required.

A few examples can illustrate this kind of usage:

- a handbook of sociology states that "The theory of interaction rituals contains some gaps that need to be filled and some fuzzy concepts that need to be differentiated." The idea is, that if finer distinctions are introduced, then the fuzziness or vagueness would be eliminated.
- a book on youth culture describes ethnicity as "a fuzzy concept that overlaps at times with concepts of race, minority, nationality and tribe". In this case, part of the fuzziness consists in the inability to distinguish precisely between a concept and a different, but closely related concept.
- a book on sociological theory argues that the Critical Theory of domination faces the problem that "reality itself has become a rather meaningless, fuzzy concept." The suggestion here is, that the variations in how theoretical concepts are applied have become so large, that the concepts could mean all kinds of things, and therefore are crucially vague (with the implication, that they are not useful any longer for that very reason).
- A history book states: "Sodomy was a vague and fuzzy concept in medieval and early modern Europe, and was often associated with a variety of supposedly related moral and criminal offenses, including heresy, witchcraft, sedition, and treason. St Thomas Aquinas... categorized sodomy with an assortment of sexual behaviours "from which generation [i.e. procreation] cannot follow". In this case, because a concept is defined by what it excludes, it remains somewhat vague what items of activity it would specifically include.

=== Mass media ===
The main reason why the term "fuzzy concept" is now often used in describing human behaviour, is that human interaction has many characteristics which are difficult to quantify and measure precisely (although we know that they have magnitudes and proportions), among other things because they are interactive and reflexive (the observers and the observed mutually influence the meaning of events). Those human characteristics can be usefully expressed only in an approximate way (see reflexivity (social theory)).

Newspaper stories frequently contain fuzzy concepts, which are readily understood and used, even although they are far from exact. Thus, many of the meanings which people ordinarily use to negotiate their way through life in reality turn out to be "fuzzy concepts". While people often do need to be exact about some things (e.g. money or time), many areas of their lives involve expressions which are far from exact.

Sometimes the term is also used in a pejorative sense. For example, a New York Times journalist wrote that Prince Sihanouk "seems unable to differentiate between friends and enemies, a disturbing trait since it suggests that he stands for nothing beyond the fuzzy concept of peace and prosperity in Cambodia".

=== Applied social science ===
The use of fuzzy logic in the social sciences and humanities has remained limited until recently. Lotfi A. Zadeh said in a 1994 interview that:

"I expected people in the social sciences – economics, psychology, philosophy, linguistics, politics, sociology, religion and numerous other areas to pick up on it. It's been somewhat of a mystery to me why even to this day, so few social scientists have discovered how useful it could be."

Two decades later, after a digital information explosion due to the growing use of the internet and mobile phones worldwide, fuzzy concepts and fuzzy logic were increasingly being applied in big data analysis of social, commercial and psychological phenomena. Many sociometric and psychometric indicators are based partly on fuzzy concepts and fuzzy variables.

Jaakko Hintikka once claimed that "the logic of natural language we are in effect already using can serve as a 'fuzzy logic' better than its trade name variant without any additional assumptions or constructions." That might help to explain why fuzzy logic has not been used much to formalize concepts in the "soft" social sciences.

Lotfi A. Zadeh rejected such an interpretation, on the ground that in many human endeavours as well as technologies it is highly important to define more exactly "to what extent" something is applicable or true, when it is known that its applicability can vary to some important extent among large populations. Reasoning which accepts and uses fuzzy concepts can be shown to be perfectly valid with the aid of fuzzy logic, because the degrees of applicability of a concept can be more precisely and efficiently defined with the aid of numerical notation.

Another possible explanation for the traditional lack of use of fuzzy logic by social scientists is simply that, beyond basic statistical analysis (using programs such as SPSS and Excel) the mathematical knowledge of social scientists is often rather limited; they may not know how to formalize and code a fuzzy concept using the conventions of fuzzy logic. The standard software packages used provide only a limited capacity to analyze fuzzy data sets, if at all, and considerable skills are required.

Yet Jaakko Hintikka may be correct, in the sense that it can be much more efficient to use natural language to denote a complex idea, than to formalize it in logical terms. The quest for formalization might introduce much more complexity, which is not wanted, and which detracts from communicating the relevant issue. Some concepts used in social science may be impossible to formalize exactly, even though they are quite useful and people understand their appropriate application quite well.

== Uncertainty ==
Fuzzy concepts can generate uncertainty because they are imprecise (especially if they refer to a process in motion, or a process of transformation where something is "in the process of turning into something else"). In that case, they do not provide a clear orientation for action or decision-making ("what does X really mean, intend or imply?"); reducing fuzziness, perhaps by applying fuzzy logic, might generate more certainty.

However, this is not necessarily always so. A concept, even although it is not fuzzy at all, and even though it is very exact, could equally well fail to capture the meaning of something adequately. That is, a concept can be very precise and exact, but not – or insufficiently – applicable or relevant in the situation to which it refers. In this sense, a definition can be "very precise", but "miss the point" altogether.

A fuzzy concept may indeed provide more security, because it provides a meaning for something when an exact concept is unavailable – which is better than not being able to denote it at all. A concept such as God, although not easily definable, for instance can provide security to the believer.

== Physics ==
In physics, the observer effect and Heisenberg's uncertainty principle indicate that there is a physical limit to the amount of precision that is knowable, with regard to the movements of subatomic particles and waves. That is, features of physical reality exist, of which we can know that they vary in magnitude, but of which we can never know or predict exactly how big or small the variations are. This insight suggests that, in some areas of our experience of the physical world, fuzziness is inevitable and can never be totally removed. Since the physical universe itself is incredibly large and diverse, it is not easy to imagine it, grasp it or describe it without using fuzzy concepts. Fuzzy logic can make an important contribution to modelling physical systems.

== Language ==
Ordinary language uses symbolic conventions and associations which are often not logical. It contains a great variety of fuzzy concepts – "knowing what you mean" will depend on knowing the relevant context and intention (or being familiar with the way in which a term is normally used, or what it is associated with). This characteristic of ordinary language can be easily verified for instance by consulting a dictionary, a thesaurus or an encyclopedia which show the multiple meanings of words, or by observing the behaviours involved in ordinary relationships which rely on mutually understood meanings (see also Imprecise language). Bertrand Russell regarded ordinary language (in contrast to logic) as intrinsically vague.

=== Implicature ===
To communicate, receive or convey a message, an individual somehow has to bridge his own intended meaning and the meanings which are understood by others, i.e., the message has to be conveyed in a way that it will be socially understood, preferably in the intended manner. Thus, people might state: "you have to say it in a way that I understand". Even if the message is clear and precise, it may nevertheless not be received in the way it was intended.

Bridging meanings may be done instinctively, habitually or unconsciously, but it usually involves a choice of terms, assumptions or symbols whose meanings are not completely fixed, but which depend among other things on how the receivers of the message respond to it, or the context. In this sense, meaning is often "negotiated" or "interactive" (or, more cynically, manipulated). This gives rise to many fuzzy concepts.

The semantic challenge of conveying meanings to an audience was explored in detail, and analyzed logically, by the British philosopher Paul Grice — using, among other things, the concept of implicature. Implicature refers to what is suggested by a message to the recipient, without being either explicitly expressed or logically entailed by its content. The suggestion could be very clear to the recipient (perhaps a sort of code), but it could also be vague or fuzzy.

=== Prototypes and family resemblance ===
In the classical Western theory of linguistics (which can be traced back to Plato and Aristotle), a concept is a mental representation of which the meaning is identified by a set of necessary and sufficient conditions. That is, an object falls under a concept, only if it meets the required logical criteria – and if that is not the case, then the object falls outside the scope of the concept. Either it is included, or it is excluded. To know the meaning of a concept or a category is a matter of identifying the necessary and sufficient conditions which make the concept or category what it is.

However, in the 1970s and 1980s proponents of the new cognitive linguistics and cognitive science highlighted the inadequacies of the classical interpretation. It failed to explain how languages work in the real world – how meanings are created and change, and how concepts are formed, represented, processed and used. Many concepts used in everyday life and in scientific research lack clear-cut, precise boundaries, they are context-dependent, and they do not conform to the fixed criteria and logical rules which the classical theory assumes. To understand more realistically what concepts are, and how they function, seemed to require a new multidisciplinary approach: linguistics had to be combined with insights from philosophy, cognitive psychology, neuro-psychology, sociology, anthropology and mathematics.

== Psychology ==
Various different aspects of human experience commonly generate concepts with fuzzy characteristics.

=== Human vs. computer ===
The formation of fuzzy concepts is partly due to the fact that the human brain does not operate like a computer (see also Chinese room).

- While ordinary computers use strict binary logic gates, the brain does not; i.e., it is capable of making all kinds of neural associations according to all kinds of ordering principles (or fairly chaotically) in associative patterns which are not logical but nevertheless meaningful. For example, a work of art can be meaningful without being logical.
- A pattern can be observably regular, ordered and/or non-arbitrary, hence meaningful, without it being possible to describe it completely or exhaustively in formal-logical terms.
- Something can be meaningful although we cannot name it, or we might only be able to name it and nothing else.
- Human brains can also interpret the same phenomenon in several different but interacting frames of reference, at the same time, or in quick succession, without there necessarily being an explicit logical connection between the frames (see also framing effect).

According to fuzzy-trace theory, partly inspired by Gestalt psychology, human intuition is a non-arbitrary, reasonable and rational process of cognition; it literally "makes sense" (see also: Problem of multiple generality).

=== Transitions in learning and consciousness ===
In part, fuzzy concepts arise also because learning or the growth of understanding involves a transition from a vague awareness, which cannot orient behaviour greatly, to clearer insight, which can orient behaviour. At the first encounter with an idea, the sense of the idea may be rather hazy. When more experience with the idea has occurred, a clearer and more precise grasp of the idea results, as well as a better understanding of how and when to use the idea (or not).

In his study of implicit learning, Arthur S. Reber affirms that there does not exist a very sharp boundary between the conscious and the unconscious, and "there are always going to be lots of fuzzy borderline cases of material that is marginally conscious and lots of elusive instances of functions and processes that seem to slip in and out of personal awareness".

Thus, an inevitable component of fuzziness exists and persists in human consciousness, because of continual variation of gradations in awareness, along a continuum from the conscious, the preconscious, and the subconscious to the unconscious. The hypnotherapist Milton H. Erickson similarly noted that the conscious mind and the unconscious normally interact.

=== Limits of distinctions and generalizations ===
Some psychologists and logicians argue that fuzzy concepts are a necessary consequence of the reality that any kind of distinction we might like to draw has limits of application. At a certain level of generality, a distinction works fine. But if we pursued its application in a very exact and rigorous manner, or overextend its application, it appears that the distinction simply does not apply in some areas or contexts, or that we cannot fully specify how it should be drawn. An analogy might be, that zooming a telescope, camera, or microscope in and out, reveals that a pattern which is sharply focused at a certain distance becomes blurry at another distance, or disappears altogether.

=== Complexity and imprecision ===
Faced with any large, complex and continually changing phenomenon, any short statement made about that phenomenon is likely to be "fuzzy", i.e., it is meaningful, but – strictly speaking – incorrect and imprecise. It will not really do full justice to the reality of what is happening with the phenomenon. A correct, precise statement would require a lot of elaborations and qualifiers. Nevertheless, the "fuzzy" description turns out to be a useful shorthand that saves a lot of time in communicating what is going on ("you know what I mean").

=== Cognition and perceptual limits ===
In psychophysics, it was discovered that the perceptual distinctions we draw in the mind are often more definite than they are in the real world. Thus, the brain actually tends to "sharpen up" or "enhance" our perceptions of differences in the external world.

- Between black and white, we are able to detect only a limited number of shades of gray, or colour gradations (there are "detection thresholds").
- Motion blur refers to the loss of detail when a person looks at a fast-moving object, or when a person is moving fast while the eyes are focused on something stationary nearby. In a movie reel, the human eye can detect a sequence of up to 10 or 12 still images per second. At around 18 to 26 frames per second, the brain will "see" the sequence of individual images as a moving scene.

If there are more gradations and transitions in reality, than our conceptual or perceptual distinctions can capture in our minds, then it could be argued that how those distinctions will actually apply, must necessarily become vaguer at some point. For the philosopher William James, the existence of "vagueness" ultimately expressed the fact that the content of reality is always richer than any conceptualizations can represent.

=== Imprecision of novelty ===
In interacting with the external world, the human mind may often encounter new, or partly new phenomena or relationships which cannot (yet) be sharply defined given the background knowledge available, and by known distinctions, associations or generalizations.

"Crisis management plans cannot be put 'on the fly' after the crisis occurs. At the outset, information is often vague, even contradictory. Events move so quickly that decision makers experience a sense of loss of control. Often denial sets in, and managers unintentionally cut off information flow about the situation" — L. Paul Bremer.

=== Fuzziness and chaos ===
It also can be argued that fuzzy concepts are generated by a certain sort of lifestyle or way of working which evades definite distinctions, makes them impossible or inoperable, or which is in some way chaotic. To obtain concepts which are not fuzzy, it must be possible to test out their application in some way. But in the absence of any relevant clear distinctions, lacking an orderly environment, or when everything is "in a state of flux" or in transition, it may not be possible to do so, so that the amount of fuzziness increases.

== Everyday occurrence ==
Fuzzy concepts often play a role in the creative process of forming new concepts to understand something. In the most primitive sense, this can be observed in infants who, through practical experience, learn to identify, distinguish and generalise the correct application of a concept, and relate it to other concepts. However, fuzzy concepts may also occur in scientific, journalistic, programming and philosophical activity, when a thinker is in the process of clarifying and defining a newly emerging concept which is based on distinctions which, for one reason or another, cannot (yet) be more exactly specified or validated. Fuzzy concepts are often used to denote complex phenomena, or to describe something which is developing and changing, which might involve shedding some old meanings and acquiring new ones.

=== Uses in different areas ===
- In meteorology, where changes and effects of complex interactions in the atmosphere are studied, the weather reports often use fuzzy expressions indicating a broad trend, likelihood, approximation or level. The main reason is that the forecast can rarely be totally exact for any given location. Nevertheless, the information is often useful to orient behaviour (e.g. "I must not forget to take my coat, or an umbrella, because it might rain").
- In biology, protein complexes with multiple structural forms are called fuzzy complexes. The different conformations can result in different, even opposite functions. The conformational ensemble is modulated by the environmental conditions. Post-translational modifications or alternative splicing can also impact the ensemble and thereby the affinity or specificity of interactions. Genetic fuzzy systems use algorithms or genetic programming which simulate natural evolutionary processes, in order to understand their structures and parameters.
- In medical diagnosis, the assessment of what the symptoms of a patient are often cannot be very exactly specified, since there are many possible qualitative and quantitative gradations in severity, incidence or frequency that could occur. Different symptoms may also overlap to some extent. These gradations can be difficult to measure, it may cost a lot of time and money, and so the medical professionals might use approximate "fuzzy" categories in their judgement of a medical condition or a patient's condition. Although it may not be exact, the diagnosis is often useful enough for treatment purposes. Fuzzy logic is increasingly employed in diagnostic and medical equipment capable of measuring gradations of a condition.
- In information services, fuzzy concepts are frequently encountered because a customer or client asks a question about something which could be interpreted in different ways, or, a document is transmitted of a type or meaning which cannot be easily allocated to a known type or category, or to a known procedure. It might take considerable inquiry to "place" the information, or establish in what framework it should be understood. Fuzzy logic can be an important aid for information retrieval systems.
- In phenomenology, which aims to study the structure of subjective experience without preconceptions, an important insight is that how someone experiences something can be shaped both by the influence of the thing being experienced itself, but also by how the person responds to it. Thus, the actual experience the person has, is shaped by an "interactive object-subject relationship". To describe this experience, fuzzy categories are often necessary, since it is often impossible to predict or describe with great exactitude what the interaction will be, and how it is experienced.
- In translation work, fuzzy concepts are analyzed for the purpose of good translation. A concept in one language may not have quite the same meaning or significance in another language, or it may not be feasible to translate it literally, or at all. Some languages have concepts which do not exist in another language, raising the problem of how one would most easily render their meaning. In computer-assisted translation, a technique called fuzzy matching is used to find the most likely translation of a piece of text, using previous translated texts as a basis.
- In hypnotherapy, fuzzy language is deliberately used for the purpose of trance induction. Hypnotic suggestions are often couched in a somewhat vague, general or ambiguous language requiring interpretation by the subject. The intention is to distract and shift the conscious awareness of the subject away from external reality to her own internal state. In response to the somewhat confusing signals she gets, the awareness of the subject spontaneously tends to withdraw inward, in search of understanding or escape.
- In business and economics, it was discovered that "we are guided less by a correct exact knowledge of our self-interest than by a socially learned, evolved, intuitive grasp derived from mental shortcuts (frames, reference points, envy, addiction, temptation, fairness)". Thus, economic preferences are often fuzzy preferences, a highly important point for suppliers of products and services. Fuzzy set empirical methodologies are increasingly used by economic analysts to analyze the extent to which members of a population belong to a specific market category, because that can make a big difference to business results.
- In sexology, sex and gender are conceptualized by gender pluralists as a spectrum or continuum, or a set of scaled characteristics (see Kinsey scale). Thus, the idea that people are either heterosexual men, heterosexual women, gay, lesbian, bisexual or transsexual is far too simplistic; gender identity is a matter of degree, a graded concept, which for that very reason is a fuzzy concept with unsharp boundaries (see also demographics of sexual orientation). For example, somebody who is "mainly" heterosexual, may occasionally have had non-heterosexual contacts, without this warranting a definite "bisexual" label. A great variety of sexual orientations are possible and can co-exist. In the course of history, typical male or female gender roles and gender characteristics can also gradually change, so that the extent to which they express "masculine" or "feminine" traits is, at any time, a matter of degree, i.e. fuzzy.
- In politics, it can be highly important and problematic how exactly a conceptual distinction is drawn, or indeed whether a distinction is drawn at all; distinctions used in administration may be deliberately sharpened, or kept fuzzy, due to some political motive or power relationship. Politicians may be deliberately vague about some things, and very clear and explicit about others; if there is information that proves their case, they become very precise, but if the information doesn't prove their case, they become vague or say nothing.
- In statistical research, it is an aim to measure the magnitudes of phenomena. For this purpose, phenomena have to be grouped and categorized, so that distinct and discrete counting units can be defined. It must be possible to allocate all observations to mutually exclusive categories, so that they are properly quantifiable. Survey observations do not spontaneously transform themselves into countable data; they have to be identified, categorized and classified in such a way, that identical observations can be grouped together, and that observations are not counted twice or more. A well-designed questionnaire ensures that the questions are interpreted in the same way by all respondents, and that the respondents are really able to answer them within the formats provided. Again, for this purpose, it is a requirement that the concepts being used are exactly and comprehensibly defined for all concerned, and not fuzzy. There could be a margin of measurement error, but the amount of error must be kept within tolerable limits, and preferably its magnitude should be known.
- In theology an attempt is made to define more precisely the meaning of spiritual concepts, which refer to how human beings construct the meaning of human existence, and, often, the relationship people have with a supernatural world. Many spiritual concepts and beliefs are fuzzy, to the extent that, although abstract, they often have a highly personalized meaning, or involve personal interpretation of a type that is not easy to define in a cut-and-dried way. A similar situation occurs in psychotherapy. The Dutch theologian Kees de Groot has explored the imprecise notion that psychotherapy is like an "implicit religion", defined as a "fuzzy concept" (it all depends on what one means by "psychotherapy" and "religion"). The philosopher of spirituality Ken Wilber argued that "nothing is 100% right or wrong", things merely "vary in their degree of incompleteness and dysfunction"; no one and nothing is 100% good or evil, each just varies "in their degree of ignorance and disconnection". This insight suggests, that all human valuations can be considered as graded concepts, where each qualitative judgement has at least implicitly a sense of quantitative proportion attached to it.
- In the legal system, it is essential that rules are interpreted and applied in a standard way, so that the same sorts of cases and the same sorts of circumstances are treated equally. Otherwise one would be accused of arbitrariness, which would not serve the interests of justice. Consequently, lawmakers aim to devise definitions and categories which are sufficiently precise, so that they are not open to different interpretations. For this purpose, it is critically important to remove fuzziness, and differences of interpretation are typically resolved through a court ruling based on evidence. Alternatively, some other procedure is devised which permits the correct distinction to be discovered and made.
- In administration, archiving and accounting, fuzziness problems in interpretation and boundary problems can arise, because it is not clear to what category exactly a case, item, document, transaction or piece of data belongs. In principle, each case, event or item must be allocated to the correct category in a procedure, but it may be, that it is difficult to make the appropriate or relevant distinctions.
- In everyday online Internet use, almost all search queries by employees, citizens and consumers are processed/solved with software partly based on fuzzy concepts, fuzzy logic and fuzzy ontologies. All the hi-tech corporations, companies and state-owned organizations use fuzzy string searching algorithms in the digital services they supply.

=== Generalities ===
Many concepts which are used fairly universally in daily life (such as "love", "God", "health", "social", "sustainability" "tolerance" etc.) are considered to be intrinsically fuzzy concepts, to the extent that their meaning usually cannot be completely and exactly specified with logical operators or objective terms, and can have multiple interpretations and personal (subjective) meanings. Yet such concepts are not at all meaningless. People keep using the concepts, even if they are difficult to define precisely.

=== Multiple meanings ===
It may also be possible to specify one personal meaning for the concept, without however placing restrictions on a different use of the concept in other contexts (as when, for example, one says "this is what I mean by X" in contrast to other possible meanings). In ordinary speech, concepts may sometimes also be uttered purely randomly; for example a child may repeat the same idea in completely unrelated contexts, or an expletive term may be uttered arbitrarily. A feeling or sense is conveyed, without it being fully clear what it is about.

Happiness may be an example of a word with variable meanings depending on context or timing.

=== Ambiguities ===
Fuzzy concepts can be used deliberately to create ambiguity and vagueness, as an evasive tactic or a ruse, or to bridge what would otherwise be immediately recognized as a contradiction of terms. They might be used to indicate that there is definitely a connection between two things, without giving a complete specification of what the connection is, for some or other reason. This could be due to a failure or refusal to be more precise. It could be academic bluff or pretense of knowledge. But it could also be a prologue to a more exact formulation of a concept, or to a better understanding of it.

== Efficiency ==
Fuzzy concepts can be used as a practical method to describe something of which a complete description would be an unmanageably large undertaking, or very time-consuming; thus, a simplified indication of what is at issue is regarded as sufficient, although it is not exact.

=== Popper ===
There is also such a thing as an "economy of distinctions", meaning that it is not helpful or efficient to use more detailed definitions than are really necessary for a given purpose. In this sense, Karl Popper rejected pedantry and commented that:

"...it is always undesirable to make an effort to increase precision for its own sake – especially linguistic precision – since this usually leads to loss of clarity, and to a waste of time and effort on preliminaries which often turn out to be useless, because they are bypassed by the real advance of the subject: one should never try to be more precise than the problem situation demands. I might perhaps state my position as follows. Every increase in clarity is of intellectual value in itself; an increase in precision or exactness has only a pragmatic value as a means to some definite end..."

The provision of "too many details" could be disorienting and confusing, instead of being enlightening, while a fuzzy term might be sufficient to provide an orientation. The reason for using fuzzy concepts can therefore be purely pragmatic, if it is not feasible or desirable (for practical purposes) to provide "all the details" about the meaning of a shared symbol or sign. Thus people might say "I realize this is not exact, but you know what I mean" – they assume practically that stating all the details is not required for the purpose of the communication.

=== Fuzzy logic gambit ===
Lotfi A. Zadeh picked up this point, and drew attention to a "major misunderstanding" about applying fuzzy logic. It is true that the basic aim of fuzzy logic is to make what is imprecise more precise. Yet in many cases, fuzzy logic is used paradoxically to "imprecisiate what is precise", meaning that there is a deliberate tolerance for imprecision for the sake of simplicity of procedure and economy of expression.

In such uses, there is a tolerance for imprecision, because making ideas more precise would be unnecessary and costly, while "imprecisiation reduces cost and enhances tractability" (tractability means "being easy to manage or operationalize"). Zadeh calls this approach the "Fuzzy Logic Gambit" (a gambit means giving up something now, to achieve a better position later).

In the Fuzzy Logic Gambit, "what is sacrificed is precision in [quantitative] value, but not precision in meaning", and more concretely, "imprecisiation in value is followed by precisiation in meaning". Zadeh cited as example Takeshi Yamakawa's programming for an inverted pendulum, where differential equations are replaced by fuzzy if-then rules in which words are used in place of numbers.

== Fuzzy concepts vs. Boolean concepts ==
Common use of this sort of approach (combining words and numbers in programming), has led some logicians to regard fuzzy logic merely as an extension of Boolean logic (a two-valued logic or binary logic is simply replaced with a many-valued logic).

However, Boolean concepts have a logical structure which differs from fuzzy concepts. An important feature in Boolean logic is, that an element of a set can also belong to any number of other sets; even so, the element either does, or does not belong to a set (or sets). By contrast, whether an element belongs to a fuzzy set is a matter of degree, and not always a definite yes-or-no question.

All the same, the Greek mathematician Costas Drossos suggests in various papers that, using a "non-standard" mathematical approach, we could also construct fuzzy sets with Boolean characteristics and Boolean sets with fuzzy characteristics. This would imply, that in practice the boundary between fuzzy sets and Boolean sets is itself fuzzy, rather than absolute. For a simplified example, we might be able to state, that a concept X is definitely applicable to a finite set of phenomena, and definitely not applicable to all other phenomena. Yet, within the finite set of relevant items, X might be fully applicable to one subset of the included phenomena, while it is applicable only "to some varying extent or degree" to another subset of phenomena which are also included in the set. Following ordinary set theory, this can generate logical problems, if e.g. overlapping subsets within sets are related to other overlapping subsets within other sets (it may seem a rather obscure issue of little significance, but it can cause more complex programming routines to malfunction).

== Clarifying methods ==
In mathematical logic, computer programming, philosophy and linguistics, fuzzy concepts can be defined more accurately, by describing the concepts using the terms of fuzzy logic or other substructural logics. With the rapid development of computer programming languages and digital processing capacity since the 1970s, it is now accepted in the sciences that there isn't just one "correct" way to formalize items of knowledge. Innovators realized that concepts and processes can be represented using many different kinds of tools, methods and systems — according to what happens to be the most useful, effective or efficient method for a given purpose. Aided by new software and artificial intelligence, many traditional and new sorts of techniques can be applied to clarify ideas, such as:

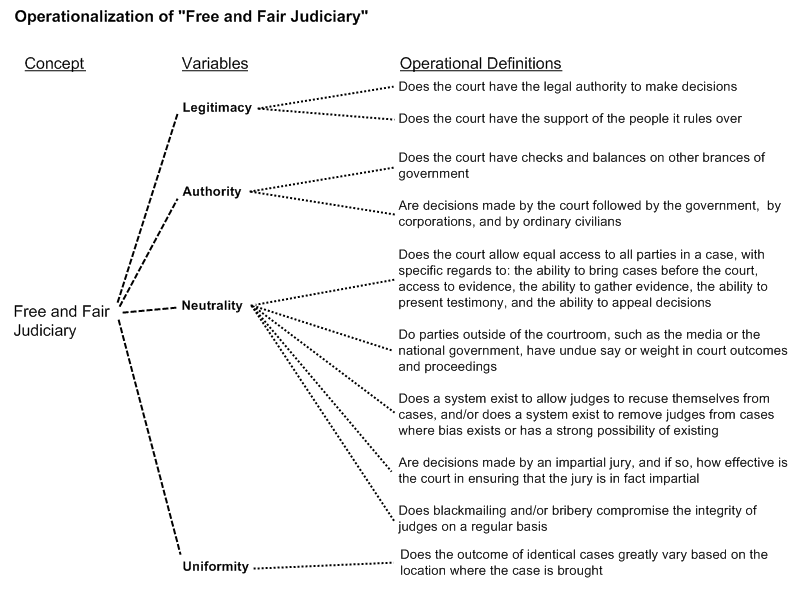
An operationalization diagram, one method of clarifying fuzzy concepts

1. Contextualizing the concept by defining the setting or situation in which the concept is used, or how it is used appropriately (context, Contextualization, Contextual inquiry, Context-based learning).
2. Identifying the intention, purpose, aim, function or goal associated with the concept (teleology, causality and design).
3. Comparing and contrasting the concept with related ideas in the present or the past (comparative and comparative research).
4. Creating a model, likeness, analogy, metaphor, prototype or narrative which shows what the concept is about or how it is applied (isomorphism, simulation or successive approximation ).
5. Probing the assumptions on which a concept is based, or which are associated with its use (critical thought, tacit assumption).
6. Mapping or graphing the applications of the concept using some basic parameters, or using some diagrams or flow charts to understand the relationships between elements involved (visualization, Operationalization and concept map).
7. Examining how likely it is that the concept applies, statistically or intuitively (probability theory).
8. Specifying relevant conditions to which the concept applies, as a procedure (computer programming, formal concept analysis).
9. Concretizing the concept – finding specific examples, illustrations, details or cases to which it applies (exemplar, exemplification).
10. Reducing or restating fuzzy concepts in terms which are simpler or similar, and which are not fuzzy or less fuzzy (simplification, dimensionality reduction, plain language, KISS principle or concision).
11. Trying out, signalling, gesturing or acting out a concept, by using/expressing it in interactions, practical work or in communication, and assessing the feedback to understand how the boundaries and distinctions of the concept are being drawn (mimesis, trial and error or pilot experiment).
12. Engaging in a structured dialogue or repeated discussion, to exchange ideas about how to get specific about what it means and how to clear it up (scrum method).
13. Allocating different applications of the concept to different but related sets (Boolean logic).
14. Identifying operational rules defining the use of the concept, which can be stated in a language and which cover all or most cases (material conditional).
15. Classifying, categorizing, grouping, or inventorizing all or most cases or uses to which the concept applies (taxonomy, cluster analysis and typology).
16. Applying a meta-language which includes fuzzy concepts in a more inclusive categorical system which is not fuzzy (meta).
17. Creating a measure or scale of the degree to which the concept applies (metrology).
18. Examining the distribution patterns or distributional frequency of (possibly different) uses of the concept (statistics).
19. Specifying a series of logical operators or inferential system which captures all or most cases to which the concept applies (algorithm).
20. Relating the fuzzy concept to other concepts which are not fuzzy or less fuzzy, or simply by replacing the fuzzy concept altogether with another, alternative concept which is not fuzzy yet "works the same way" (proxy)
21. Engaging in meditation, taking a pause to relax, or taking the proverbial "run around the block" to clarify the mind, and thus improve precision of thought about the definitional issue (self-care).

In this way, we can obtain a more exact understanding of the meaning and use of a fuzzy concept, and possibly decrease the amount of fuzziness. It may not be possible to specify all the possible meanings or applications of a concept completely and exhaustively, but if it is possible for a description to capture the majority of them, statistically or otherwise, this may be useful enough for practical purposes. Human cognition, behavioural repertoires, memory, training and creativity provide an immense capacity to clarify things and define them more precisely, even if at first there is a terrible muddle and confusion (see also Eureka effect).

== Defuzzification ==
A process of defuzzification is said to occur, when fuzzy concepts can be logically described in terms of fuzzy sets, or the relationships between fuzzy sets, which makes it possible to define variations in the meaning or applicability of concepts as quantities. Effectively, qualitative differences are in that case described more precisely as quantitative variations, or quantitative variability. Assigning a numerical value then denotes the magnitude of variation along a scale from zero to one.

The difficulty that can occur in judging the fuzziness of a concept can be illustrated with the question "Is this one of those?". If it is not possible to clearly answer this question, that could be because "this" (the object) is itself fuzzy and evades definition, or because "one of those" (the concept of the object) is fuzzy and inadequately defined. Thus, the source of fuzziness may be (1) the nature of the reality being dealt with, (2) the concepts used to interpret it, or (3) the way in which the two are being related by a person. Additional sources of fuzziness can arise when (4) the interpretation of one person is socially shared with other persons whose understanding is not exactly the same, or when (5) an idea is communicated between persons who are situated in different physical locations. It may be that the personal meanings which people attach to something are quite clear to the persons themselves, but that it is not possible to communicate those meanings to others except as fuzzy concepts.

== See also ==
- Alternative set theory
- Approximate measures
- Approximation
- Approximation algorithm
- Approximation theory
- Classical logic
- Classification
- categorical data
- Cognitive categorization
- Concept
- Defuzzification
- Degree of truth
- Detection theory
- Deviant logic
- Dialectic
- Essentially contested concept
- European Society for Fuzzy Logic and Technology
- Fuzzy classification
- Fuzzy clustering
- Fuzzy logic
- Fuzzy markup language
- Fuzzy mathematics
- Fuzzy measure theory
- Fuzzy number
- Fuzzy set operations
- Fuzzy set theory
- Fuzzy Sets and Systems
- Fuzzy subalgebra
- George Klir
- High-performance fuzzy computing
- Identity (Philosophy)
- Interval finite element
- Jakobson's functions of language
- Linear partial information
- Many-valued logic
- Multiset
- Neuro-fuzzy
- Non-well-founded set theory
- Obfuscation
- Opaque context
- Paraconsistent logic
- Phenomenology (psychology)
- Precision
- Referential transparency
- reflexivity (social theory)
- Post-normal science
- Rough fuzzy hybridization
- Rough set
- Semiset
- Sørensen similarity index
- Synchronicity
- Type-2 Fuzzy Sets and Systems
- Uncertainty
- Vague set
- Vagueness
- Vagueness and Degrees of Truth
