= Nicholas Smith =

Nicholas Smith may refer to:

- Nicholas Smith (actor) (1934–2015), English television actor
- Nicholas Smith (cricketer) (born 1946), New Zealand cricketer
- Nick Smith (footballer, born 1984), Australian rules football player for Melbourne
- Nick Smith (footballer, born 1988), Australian rules football player for the Sydney Swans
- Nicholas D. Smith, American philosopher
- Nicholas H. Smith, Australian philosopher (Macquarie University)
- Nicholas J. J. Smith, Australian philosopher (University of Sydney)
- Nicholas G. Smith (1881–1945), American leader in The Church of Jesus Christ of Latter-day Saints
- Nicholas Smith (MP), English politician
- Nicholas M. Smith Jr. (1914–2003), nuclear physicist and research consultant
- Nicholas Smith (Illinois politician), member of the Illinois House of Representatives
- Nicholas Hankey Smith (1771–1837), British diplomat
- Nicholas Michael Smith (born 1967), British conductor and composer

== See also ==
- Nick Smith (disambiguation)
- Nicolaas Smit (1832–1896), Boer general
- Nicky Smith (disambiguation)
