= Nick Smith =

Nick Smith may refer to:

== Politicians ==
- Nick Smith (British politician) (born 1960), Labour Member of Parliament for Blaenau Gwent
- Nick Smith (American politician) (born 1934), American congressman from Michigan
- Nick Smith (New Zealand politician) (born 1964), Member of Parliament for Nelson

== Others ==
- Nick Smith (footballer, born 1984), Australian rules football player for Melbourne
- Nick Smith (footballer, born 1988), Australian rules football player for the Sydney Swans
- Nick Smith (Home and Away), character in the Australian television soap opera Home and Away
- Nick Smith (ice hockey) (born 1979), Canadian NHL player with the Florida Panthers
- Nick Smith (canoeist) (born 1969), British slalom canoer
- Nick Smith Jr. (born 2004), American basketball player
- Nicholas J. J. Smith, Australian philosopher
- Nicholas Michael Smith (born 1967), British conductor and composer
- Nic Smith, New Zealand academic

== See also ==
- Nicholas Smith (disambiguation)
- Nicky Smith (disambiguation)
