= John Blakely =

British musician

John P R Blakely (born 1947) is an English pianist and piano teacher at the Royal College of Music with "an international reputation as a chamber musician and accompanist".

Born the son of a medical doctor, he was educated at Highgate School until 1964 and proceeded to study at the Royal Academy of Music, winning all the relevant major prizes. He then won a Nettleship music scholarship to Balliol College, Oxford.

In 1987, Blakely accompanied tenor Neil Mackie in the world premiere of Kenneth Leighton's song cycle Earth, Sweet Earth. He has recorded seven CDs, including Beethoven's Spring Sonata with Lorraine McAslan, which was declared 'first choice' of all available versions by BBC Radio 3's CD Review. His many pupils have included Alisdair Hogarth who said that "John was brilliant and was a master of helping you completely get your head around an issue in a piece by summing it up in one sentence".
