= HPFC =

HPFC may refer to:

- Hourly Price Forward Curve
- Hanover Park F.C.
- Harwich & Parkeston F.C.
- High Performance FC
- High Performance Fuzzy Computing
- Highlands Park F.C.
