= Logic: The Laws of Truth =

2012 book by Nicholas J. Smith

- Authors: Nicholas J. Smith
- Language: English
- Subject: logics
- Publisher: Princeton University Press
- Publication date: 2012
- Media type: Print (Paperback)
- Pages: 544 pp.
- ISBN: 9780691151632

Logic: The Laws of Truth is a 2012 book by Nicholas J. Smith, in which the author provides an introduction to classical logic. It covers the formal tools and techniques of logic and their underlying rationales and broader philosophical significance. The book also presents various forms of proof: proof trees, major variants of natural deduction, axiomatic proofs, and sequent calculus. It also includes numerous logical exercises.
