= Vague set =

System in mathematical set theory

In mathematics, vague sets are an extension of fuzzy sets.

In a fuzzy set, each object is assigned a single value in the interval [0,1] reflecting its grade of membership. This single value does not allow a separation of evidence for membership and evidence against membership.

Gau et al. proposed the notion of vague sets, where each object is characterized by two different membership functions: a true membership function and a false membership function. This kind of reasoning is also called interval membership, as opposed to point membership in the context of fuzzy sets.

== Mathematical definition ==
A vague set $V$ is characterized by

- its true membership function $t_v(x)$
- its false membership function $f_v(x)$
- with $0 \le t_v(x)+f_v(x) \le 1$

The grade of membership for x is not a crisp value anymore, but can be located in $[t_v(x), 1-f_v(x)]$. This interval can be interpreted as an extension to the fuzzy membership function. The vague set degenerates to a fuzzy set, if $1-f_v(x)=t_v(x)$ for all x. The uncertainty of x is the difference between the upper and lower bounds of the membership interval; it can be computed as $(1-f_v(x))-t_v(x)$.

== See also ==
- Fuzzy set
- Fuzzy concept
