= Jech–Kunen tree =

Tree in set theory

A Jech–Kunen tree is a set-theoretic tree with properties that are incompatible with the generalized continuum hypothesis. It is named after Thomas Jech and Kenneth Kunen, both of whom studied the possibility and consequences of its existence.

== Definition ==
In set theory, a tree is a partially ordered set in which the predecessors of any element form a well-ordering. The height of any element is the order type of this well-ordering, and the height of the tree is the least ordinal number that exceeds the height of all elements. A branch of a tree is a maximal well-ordered subset. A ω_{1}-tree is a tree with cardinality $\aleph_1$ and height ω_{1}, where ω_{1} is the first uncountable ordinal and $\aleph_1$ is the associated cardinal number. A Jech–Kunen tree is a ω_{1}-tree in which the number of branches is greater than $\aleph_1$ and less than $2^{\aleph_1}$.

== Existence ==
The generalized continuum hypothesis implies that there is no cardinal number between $\aleph_1$ and $2^{\aleph_1}$; when this is the case, a Jech–Kunen tree cannot exist, because it is required to have a number of branches strictly between these two numbers. Thomas Jech (1971) found the first model in which this tree exists, and Kenneth Kunen (1975) showed that, assuming the continuum hypothesis and $2^{\aleph_1} > \aleph_2$ , the existence of a Jech–Kunen tree is equivalent to the existence of a compact Hausdorff space with weight $\aleph_1$ and cardinality strictly between $\aleph_1$ and $2^{\aleph_1}$.
