= Bohuslav Balcar =

Czech mathematician

Bohuslav Balcar (Czech pronunciation: [ˈboɦuslav ˈbaltsar]; 1943 – 2017) was a Czech mathematician. He was a senior researcher at the Center for Theoretical Study (CTS), and a professor at Charles University in Prague. His research interests were mainly related to foundations of mathematics.

Balcar received his Ph.D. in 1966 from Charles University. His Ph.D. supervisor was Petr Vopěnka.
