= Karel Hrbáček =

Mathematician

Karel Hrbáček (born 1944) is professor emeritus of mathematics at City College of New York. He specializes in mathematical logic, set theory, and non-standard analysis.

== Early life and education ==
Karel studied at Charles University with Petr Vopěnka, looking at large cardinal numbers. He was awarded the degree RNDr. Before his appointment at City College of New York he was an exchange fellow at University of California, Berkeley and a research associate at Rockefeller University. In 1980 he received an award from the Mathematical Association of America for his article on Non-standard Set Theory.

== Selected publications ==
- 1999: (with Thomas Jech) Introduction to Set Theory, Third edition. Monographs and Textbooks in Pure and Applied Mathematics, 220. Marcel Dekker ISBN 0-8247-7915-0
- 1992: (with David Ballard) "Standard foundations for nonstandard analysis", Journal of Symbolic Logic 57(2): 741–748 MR 1169206
- 1979: "Nonstandard set theory", American Mathematical Monthly 86(8): 659–677 MR 0546178
- 1978: "Axiomatic foundations for nonstandard analysis", Fundamenta Mathematicae 98(1): 1–19 MR 0528351
