= Petr Vopěnka =

Czech mathematician (1935-2015)

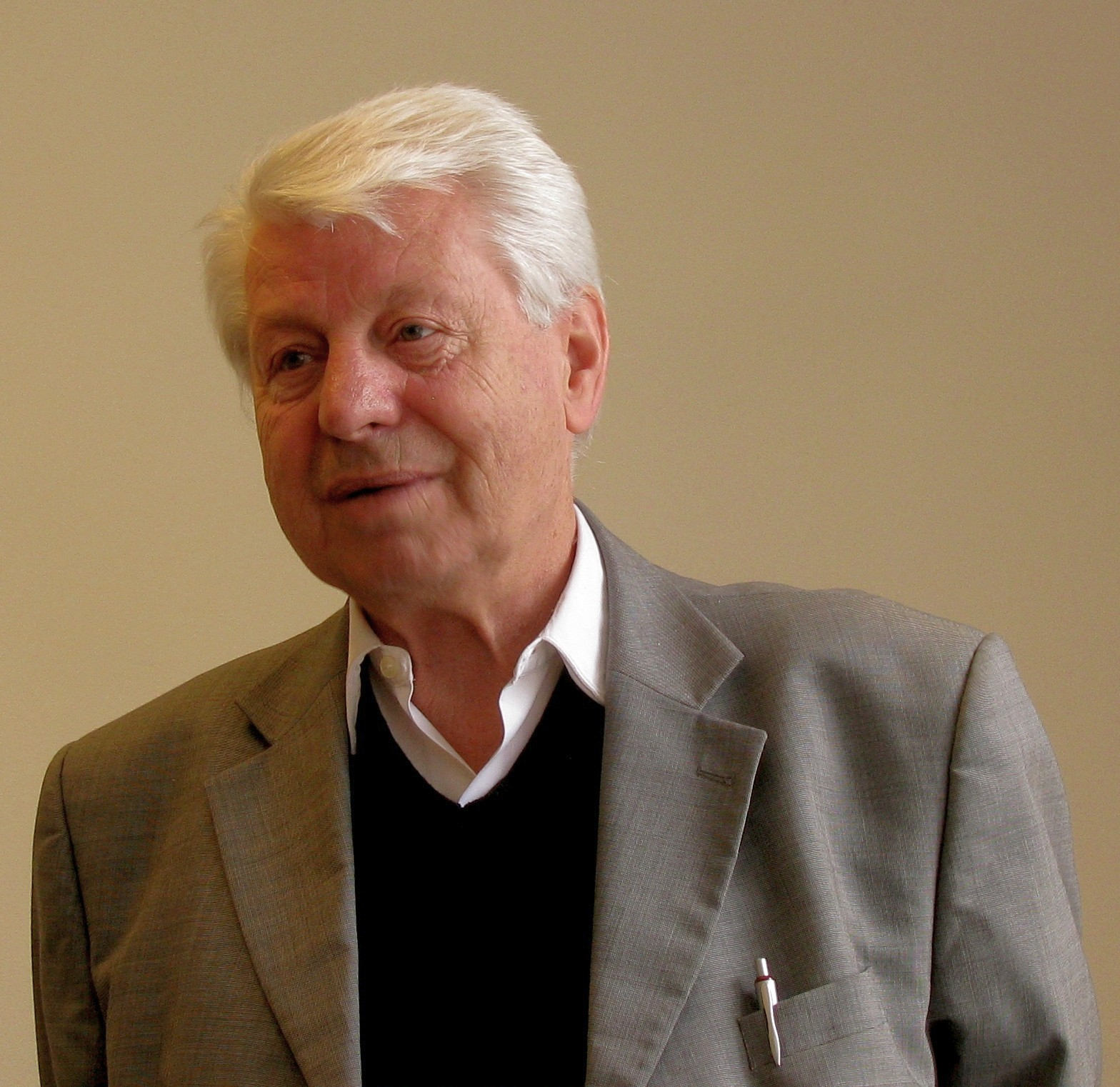
- Petr Vopěnka in 2009
- Born: 16 May 1935; Prague, Czechoslovakia
- Died: 20 March 2015 (aged 79)
- Education: Mathematics and Physics Faculty, Charles University in Prague
- Scientific career
- Doctoral students: Bohuslav Balcar; Petr Hájek; Karel Hrbáček; Thomas Jech

Petr Vopěnka (16 May 1935 – 20 March 2015) was a Czech mathematician. In the early seventies, he developed alternative set theory (i.e. alternative to the classical Cantor theory), which he subsequently developed in a series of articles and monographs. Vopěnka’s name is associated with many mathematical achievements, including Vopěnka's principle. Since the mid-eighties he concerned himself with philosophical questions of mathematics (particularly vis-à-vis Husserlian phenomenology).

Vopěnka served as the Minister of Education of the Czech Republic (then part of Czechoslovakia) from 1990 to 1992 within the government of Prime Minister Petr Pithart.

== Biography ==
Petr Vopěnka grew up in the small town of Dolní Kralovice. After finishing gymnasium in Ledeč nad Sázavou in 1953 he went to study mathematics at the Mathematics and Physics Faculty of Charles University in Prague, graduating in 1958. In 1962 he was made Candidate of Sciences (CSc) and in 1967 Doctor of Science (DrSc). His advisors were Eduard Čech and Ladislav Rieger.

Starting in 1958 Vopěnka taught at the Mathematics and Physics Faculty, since 1964 as lecturer, since 1965 as senior lecturer. In 1968 he was made professor but was prevented to take this title until 1990 due to political reasons. Between 1966 and 1969 Vopěnka served as Vice Dean of the faculty.

In 1967 Vopěnka became head of the newly established Department of Mathematical Logic. The department was abolished in 1970 and Vopěnka, though allowed to stay at the university, fell into disfavour with the regime, which limited his contacts with foreign mathematicians. During the 1970s and 1980s he concentrated on philosophy and history of mathematics and on phenomenology of infinity.

After the Velvet Revolution, in January 1990, Vopěnka became Deputy Rector of the Charles University. During the period June 1990 – July 1992 he served as Minister of Education of the Czech Republic (then part of Czechoslovakia). In this position he, without much success and facing protests from the teachers, attempted to institute school reforms.

In 1992 the Department of Mathematical Logic was reopened and Vopěnka became its head. In 2000 he retired from the Charles University and the department was closed. Until 2009 Vopěnka worked as a professor at the Jan Evangelista Purkyně University in Ústí nad Labem, in the Department of Mathematics of the Faculty of Science.

Petr Vopěnka also participated in translation and publishing of early mathematical texts (such as works of Euclid and Al-Khwarezmi) into the Czech language, and then he worked at the Department of Philosophy and Department of Interdisciplinary Activities, University of West Bohemia in Plzeň.

== Bibliography ==
- Petr Vopěnka (2004). Horizonty nekonečna. Prague: Moraviapress. ISBN 80-86181-66-9.
- Petr Vopěnka (1999). Úhelný kámen evropské vzdělanosti a moci. Prague: Práh. ISBN 80-7252-022-9.
- Petr Vopěnka (1989). Introduction to mathematics in the alternative set theory. Bratislava: Alfa. ISBN 80-05-00438-9.
- Petr Vopěnka (1979). Mathematics in the Alternative Set Theory. Leipzig: Teubner. ASIN B0006E3AXY.
- Petr Vopěnka, Petr Hájek (1972). The Theory of Semisets. Amsterdam, Prague: North-Holland. ISBN 0-7204-2267-1.

== See also ==
- Semiset
- Vopěnka's principle
