= Kenneth Kunen =

American mathematician (1943–2020)

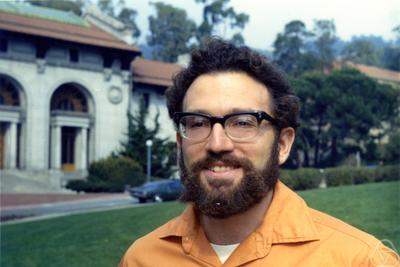
- Kunen, Hearst Mining Building, 1972
- Born: Herbert Kenneth Kunen; August 2, 1943; New York City
- Died: August 14, 2020 (aged 77)
- Education: California Institute of Technology; Stanford University
- Known for: set theory, set-theoretic topology, non-associative algebraic systems
- Scientific career
- Fields: Mathematics
- Workplaces: University of Wisconsin–Madison
- Thesis: Inaccessibility Properties of Cardinals (1968)
- Doctoral advisor: Dana Scott

Herbert Kenneth Kunen (August 2, 1943 – August 14, 2020) was a professor of mathematics at the University of Wisconsin–Madison who worked in set theory and its applications to various areas of mathematics, such as set-theoretic topology and measure theory. He also worked on non-associative algebraic systems, such as loops, and used computer software, such as the Otter theorem prover, to derive theorems in these areas.

== Personal life ==
Kunen was born in New York City in 1943 and died in 2020. He lived in Madison, Wisconsin, with his wife Anne, with whom he had two sons, Isaac and Adam.

== Education ==
Kunen completed his undergraduate degree at the California Institute of Technology and received his Ph.D. in 1968 from Stanford University, where he was supervised by Dana Scott.

== Career and research ==
Kunen showed that if there exists a nontrivial elementary embedding j : L → L of the constructible universe, then 0^{#} exists. He proved the consistency of a normal, $\aleph_2$-saturated ideal on $\aleph_1$ from the consistency of the existence of a huge cardinal. He introduced the method of iterated ultrapowers, with which he proved that if $\kappa$ is a measurable cardinal with $2^\kappa>\kappa^+$ or $\kappa$ is a strongly compact cardinal then there is an inner model of set theory with $\kappa$ many measurable cardinals. He proved Kunen's inconsistency theorem showing the impossibility of a nontrivial elementary embedding $V\to V$ with the axiom of choice, which had been suggested as a large cardinal assumption (a Reinhardt cardinal).

Away from the area of large cardinals, Kunen is known for intricate forcing and combinatorial constructions. He proved that it is consistent that Martin's axiom first fails at a singular cardinal and constructed under the continuum hypothesis a compact L-space supporting a nonseparable measure. He also showed that $P(\omega)/Fin$ has no increasing chain of length $\omega_2$ in the standard Cohen model where the continuum is $\aleph_2$. The concept of a Jech–Kunen tree is named after him and Thomas Jech.

== Bibliography ==
The journal Topology and its Applications has dedicated a special issue to "Ken" Kunen, containing a biography by Arnold W. Miller, and surveys about Kunen's research in various fields by Mary Ellen Rudin, Akihiro Kanamori, István Juhász, Jan van Mill, Dikran Dikranjan, and Michael Kinyon.

== Selected publications ==
- Set Theory. College Publications, 2011. ISBN 978-1848900509.
- The Foundations of Mathematics. College Publications, 2009. ISBN 978-1-904987-14-7.
- Set Theory: An Introduction to Independence Proofs. North-Holland, 1980. ISBN 0-444-85401-0.
- (co-edited with Jerry E. Vaughan). Handbook of Set-Theoretic Topology. North-Holland, 1984. ISBN 0-444-86580-2.
