= Thomas Jech =

Czech mathematician

Thomas J. Jech (Czech: Tomáš Jech, pronounced [ˈtomaːʃ ˈjɛx]; born 29 January 1944 in Prague) is a mathematician specializing in set theory who was at Penn State for more than 25 years.

== Life ==
He was educated at Charles University (his advisor was Petr Vopěnka) and from 2000 is at the Institute of Mathematics of the Academy of Sciences of the Czech Republic.

== Work ==
Jech's research also includes mathematical logic, algebra, analysis, topology, and measure theory.

Jech gave the first published proof of the consistency of the existence of a Suslin line. With Karel Prikry, he introduced the notion of precipitous ideal. He gave several models where the axiom of choice failed, for example one with ω_{1} measurable. The concept of a Jech–Kunen tree is named after him and Kenneth Kunen.

== Bibliography ==
- "Non-provability of Souslin's hypothesis", Comment. Math. Univ. Carolinae, 8: 291–305, 1967, MR 0215729
- Lectures in set theory, with particular emphasis on the method of forcing, Springer-Verlag Lecture Notes in Mathematics 217 (1971) (ISBN 978-3540055648)
- The axiom of choice, North-Holland 1973 (Dover paperback edition ISBN 978-0-486-46624-8)
- (with K. Hrbáček) Introduction to set theory, Marcel Dekker, 3rd edition 1999 (ISBN 978-0824779153)
- Multiple forcing, Cambridge University Press 1986 (ISBN 978-0521266598)
- Set Theory: The Third Millennium Edition, revised and expanded, 2006, Springer Science & Business Media, ISBN 3-540-44085-2. 1st ed. 1978; 2nd (corrected) ed. 1997
