= Degree of truth =

Concept in logic

In classical logic, propositions are typically unambiguously considered as being true or false. For instance, the proposition one is both equal and not equal to itself is regarded as simply false, being contrary to the Law of Noncontradiction; while the proposition one is equal to one is regarded as simply true, by the Law of Identity. However, some mathematicians, computer scientists, and philosophers have been attracted to the idea that a proposition might be more or less true, rather than wholly true or wholly false. Consider this pizza is hot.

In mathematics, this idea can be developed in terms of fuzzy logic. In computer science, it has found application in artificial intelligence. In philosophy, the idea has proved particularly appealing in the case of vagueness. Degrees of truth is an important concept in law.

The term is an older concept than conditional probability. Instead of determining the objective probability, only a subjective assessment is defined.

In adjudicative processes, 'substantive truth' is distinct from 'formal legal truth' which comes in four degrees: hearsay, balance of probabilities, proven beyond reasonable doubt and absolute truth (knowledge reserved unto God).

== See also ==
Language

- Meaning (linguistics) — Semiotics

Technology

- Artificial intelligence

Logic

- Bivalence
- Fuzzy logic
- Fuzzy set
- Half-truth
- Multi-valued logic
- Paradox of the heap
- Truth
- Truth value
- Vagueness

Books

- Vagueness and Degrees of Truth

== Bibliography ==
- L.A. Zadeh (June 1965). "Fuzzy sets". Information and control. 8 (3). San Diego: 338–353. doi:10.1016/S0019-9958(65)90241-X. ISSN 0019-9958. Zbl 0139.24606. Wikidata Q25938993.
