= Nicholas Michael Smith =

English conductor (born 1967)

Nicholas Michael Smith OBE
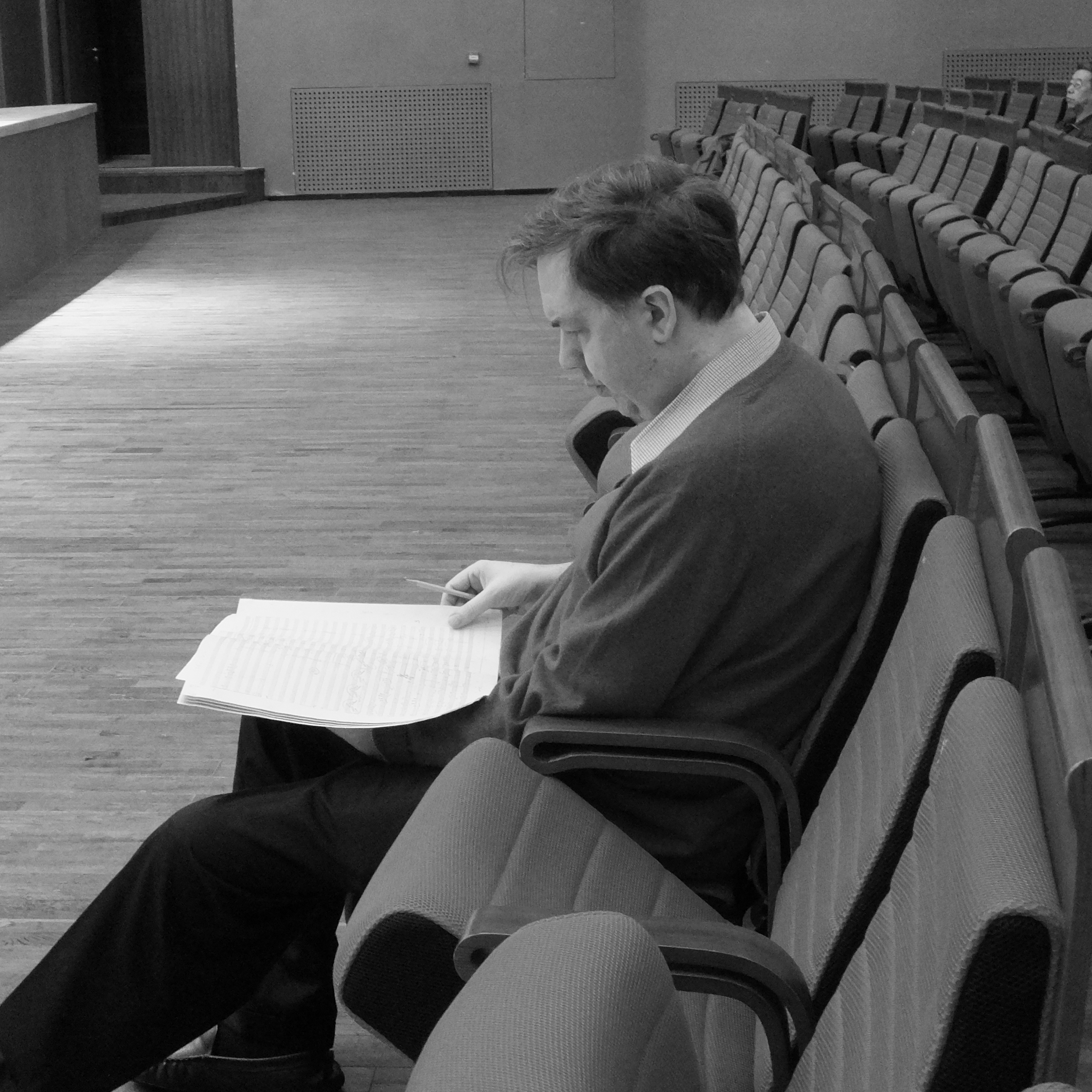
- Nicholas Michael Smith, Beijing 2014
- Born: 1967 (age 58–59)
- Education: St John’s College Cambridge
- Occupations: Classical conductor and composer
- Years active: 1994–present
- Spouse: Shen Yue (pianist)

Nicholas Michael Smith OBE (born 1967, also known as Nick Smith, Chinese: 尼克 史密斯; pinyin: Níkè Shǐmìsī) is a British conductor, composer, and music educator.

Since 1994, Smith has lived and worked in the People's Republic of China. His contributions to classical music performance and education in China have been the subject of documentaries and interviews on Chinese television and radio.

In 2011, Smith was awarded an OBE in recognition of his "services to music and to UK/China relations".

== Biography ==
After relocating to Beijing in 1995, Smith worked with the Beijing Concert Hall on educational concerts to foster interest in western classical music with Chinese audiences. In 1997, Smith founded the Peking Sinfonietta and, in 2002, the Beijing International Festival Chorus.

In 2016 and 2018, Smith conducted a series of Chinese music concerts at London’s Cadogan Hall, performing Xian Xinghai’s Yellow River Cantata, choral arrangements of Chinese folk songs, and vocal settings of Tang poetry. He worked in collaboration with Canadian composer David Braid on improvisational performances fusing jazz piano and traditional Chinese music.

Smith has worked with Chinese author Hong Ying composing incidental music for her children’s book The Girl from the French Fort, premiering the work at Beijing Concert Hall in 2016. Smith has also translated several of Hong Ying’s children’s books into English.

In 2019, Smith's recording of the oratorio Corona Divinae Misericordiae by David Braid with soprano Patricia O'Callaghan was nominated for a Juno Award for 'Classical Album of the Year'.

In 2020, his recording of works by British composer Ed Hughes with The New Music Players, Ed Hughes: Time, Space & Change, was nominated by The Sunday Times as one of their 'Best Albums of 2020'.

Smith's first opera "The Stone God" had its premiere at the Bloomsbury Theatre, London, in November 2024, with musical direction by Justin Lavender.

== Appointments ==
In 2007, Smith was appointed an honorary professor of conducting at the China Conservatory of Music. In 2012, he was appointed an honorary professor of the Tianjin Conservatory of Music. He also served as a governor of Harrow School, Beijing.

== Personal life ==
Smith lives in Beijing with his wife, pianist Shen Yue, and their son.

== Compositions and projects ==
Orchestral

- Tears From My Bowl, 2015
- An Englishman in Beijing, 2015
- Changchun Impressions, 2016
- The Girl From the French Fort, 2016, incidental music to accompany story by Hong Ying

Opera

- The Stone God, 2024

Choral

- Mass for St Barnabas, 1987
- Introit, 1990, text from Psalm 31
- Vegetable Picking Song, 1997, Sichuan folksong arr. for SATB choir
- Rainy Day, 2015, Guangdong folksong arr. for SATB or SSA choir

Vocal

- Two Poems, 1990, text by Robert Frost, (written for Jeremy Huw Williams)
- Love, Friendship and Longing, 2018, Tang poetry arr. for SATB soloists and piano duet

Solo and Chamber Instrumental

- Maluccio, 1990, for organ (written for Andrew Nethsingha)
- Four Microscopic Duets, 1990, piano duet
- Memories of Childhood, 2019, piano duet
- Waiting, 2020, for trumpet and piano

Arrangements

- Xian Xinghai Music Collection I for Band, 2022, music by Xian Xinghai, arr. for symphonic wind band by Nicholas M Smith

== Discography ==
Title	Year	Details
British Celebration	2016	Released: 8 April 2016; Label: Heritage; Catalogue No: HTGCD203; Artists: RTÉ Concert Orchestra, Alisdair Hogarth; Composers: Nicholas Smith et al. (compilation); Conductor: Gavin Sutherland
British Celebration 2	2017	Released: 1 December 2017; Label: Heritage; Catalogue No: HTGCD192; Artists: Royal Ballet Sinfonia, BBC Concert Orchestra; Composers: Nicholas Smith et al. (compilation); Conductors: Gavin Sutherland, Barry Wordsworth
David Braid: Corona Divinae Misericordiae	2018	Released: 1 November 2018; Label: K52 Music; Artists: Epoque Chamber Orchestra, Patricia O'Callaghan, The Elmer Iseler Singers & Sinfonia UK Collective; Composer: David Braid; Conductors: Nicholas Michael Smith, Shawn Grenke
Ed Hughes: Time, Space, and Change	2020	Released: March 2020; Label: Divine Art; Catalogue No: MSV 28597; EAN/UPC: 809730859724; Artists: New Music Players, Orchestra of Sound and Light; Composer: Ed Hughes; Conductors: Nicholas Michael Smith, Ed Hughes
Nicholas Michael Smith: The Girl from the French Fort	2026	Released: 13 February 2026; Label: Métier; Catalogue No: MEX77142; EAN/UPC: 809730714221; Artists: Gerry Cornelius, New Music Players, Niki Yan, Tim Bentinck; Composer: Nicholas Michael Smith; Conductor: Gerry Cornelius
