= European Society for Fuzzy Logic and Technology =

- Formation: 1998
- Members: 850+
- President: Gabriella Pasi
- Website: http://www.eusflat.org/

The European Society for Fuzzy Logic and Technology (EUSFLAT) is a scientific association with the aims to disseminate and promote fuzzy logic and related subjects (sometimes comprised under the collective terms soft computing or computational intelligence) and to provide a platform for exchange between scientists and engineers working in these fields. The society is both open for academic and industrial members.

== History ==
EUSFLAT was founded in 1998 in Spain as the successor of the National Spanish Fuzzy Logic Society, ESTYLF, with the aim to open the society for members from other European countries. Since then, the society managed to attract a large share of members from outside Spain, and even beyond Europe, with the Spanish members still being the largest group inside EUSFLAT. For these historical reasons, the society is officially registered in Spain.

== Conferences ==
Starting with 1999, EUSFLAT has been organizing its biannual conferences in odd years. Previous meetings:

- Palma de Mallorca, Balearic Islands, Spain, September 22–25, 1999 (jointly with National Spanish conference, ESTYLF)
- Leicester, United Kingdom, September 5–7, 2001
- Zittau, Germany, September 10–12, 2003
- Barcelona, Catalonia, Spain, September 7–9, 2005 (jointly with 11th Rencontres Francophones sur la Logique Floue et ses Applications)
- Ostrava, Czech Republic, September 11–14, 2007
- Lisbon, Portugal, July 20–24, 2009 (jointly with 13th World Congress of the International Fuzzy Systems Association)
- Aix-les-Bains, France, July 18–22, 2011 (jointly with Les Rencontres Francophones sur la Logique Floue et ses Applications)
- Milan, Italy, September 11–13, 2013
- Gijón, Spain, June, 30–3 July 2015

== Publications ==
- EUSFLAT publishes the proceedings of its conferences in an open access manner.
- Until 2010, Mathware & Soft Computing was the official journal of EUSFLAT. On July 1, 2010, the International Journal of Computational Intelligence Systems (Atlantis Press, ISSN 1875-6891 (print) / ISSN 1875-6883 (on-line)) became the official journal of EUSFLAT.
- EUSFLAT publishes an electronic newsletter with three issues a year.

== Presidents ==
EUSFLAT is led by the President, who is elected for a two-year period, and cannot serve for more than two consecutive periods.

- Francesc Esteva (1998–2011)
- Luis Magdalena (2001–2005)
- Ulrich Bodenhofer (2005–2009)
- Javier Montero (2009–2013)
- Gabriella Pasi (2013–present)
