= Petr Hájek =

Czech scientist and professor

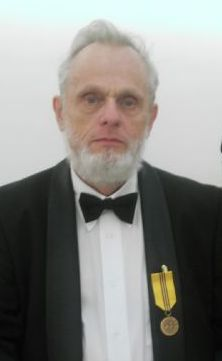
Prof. RNDr. Petr Hájek, DrSc.

Petr Hájek (Czech pronunciation: [ˈpɛtr̩ ˈɦaːjɛk]; 6 February 1940 – 26 December 2016) was a Czech scientist in the area of mathematical logic and a professor of mathematics. Born in Prague, he worked at the Institute of Computer Science at the Academy of Sciences of the Czech Republic and as a lecturer at the faculty of mathematics and physics at the Charles University in Prague and at the Faculty of Nuclear Sciences and Physical Engineering of the Czech Technical University in Prague.

== Academics ==
Petr Hájek studied at the faculty of mathematics and physics of the Charles University in Prague. Influenced by Petr Vopěnka, he specialized in set theory and arithmetic, and later also in logic and artificial intelligence. He contributed to establishing the mathematical fundamentals of fuzzy logic. Following the Velvet Revolution, he was appointed a senior lecturer (1993) and a professor (1997). From 1992 to 2000 he held the position of chairman of the Institute of Computer Science at the Academy of Sciences of the Czech Republic. From 1996 to 2003 he was also president of the Kurt Gödel Society.

Later, he graduated from the Academy of Performing Arts in Prague, where he studied the pipe organ under Jiří Reinberger to become an organ player in a church.

== Awards ==
- 2002, Medal of the Minister of Education of the Czech Republic
- 2006, Medal of Merit, third grade, in the area of sciences by President of the Czech Republic Václav Klaus
- 2008, doctor honoris causa from Silesian University in Opava

== Papers ==
- Hájek, Petr; Kalášek, Pavel; Kůrka, Petr (1960). O dynamické logice. Praha: Academia.
- Vopěnka, Petr; Hájek, Petr (1972). The Theory of Semisets. Trans. Jech, T. and Rousseau, G. Praha: Academia.
- Hájek, Petr; Havránek, Tomáš; Chytil, Metoděj K. (1983). Metoda GUHA: automatická tvorba hypotéz. Praha: Academia.
- Hájek, Petr; Pudlák, Pavel (1993). Metamathematics of First-Order Arithmetic. Berlin: Springer.

== See also ==
- Semiset
