= Vagueness and Degrees of Truth =

2008 book by Nicholas J. Smith

- Authors: Nicholas J. Smith
- Language: English
- Subject: logic
- Publisher: Oxford University Press
- Publication date: 2008
- Media type: Print (Paperback)
- Pages: 350 pp.
- ISBN: 9780199674466

Vagueness and Degrees of Truth is a 2008 book by Nicholas J. Smith, in which the author examines vagueness based on the idea of "degrees of truth". It means that although some sentences are true and some are false, others possess intermediate truth values. In other words, some sentences are truer than the false sentences, but not as true as the true ones.

== See also ==
- Fuzzy logic
- Half-truth
