= Nick Smith (footballer, born 1984) =

Australian rules footballer

Personal information
- Born: 27 August 1984 (age 42)
- Original team: Norwood (SANFL)
- Debut: Round 3, 2003, Melbourne vs. Western Bulldogs, at Telstra Dome
- Height: 198 cm (6 ft 6 in)
- Weight: 97 kg (214 lb)

Playing career^{1}
Years	Club	Games (Goals)
2003–2006	Melbourne	4 (0)
- ^{1} Playing statistics correct to the end of 2006.

Nicholas Smith (born 27 August 1984) is an Australian rules footballer with the Box Hill Hawks of the Victorian Football League (VFL). Previously, Smith played for the Melbourne Football Club in the Australian Football League (AFL).

Recruited from South Australian National Football League club Norwood in the 2002 AFL draft, Smith debuted in 2003 for Melbourne, playing three games for the season, but having little game time or impact.

In 2004 and 2005, Smith played with Melbourne's VFL-affiliate, Sandringham, suffered a knee injury in 2005 which ended his season prematurely.

Smith played in the VFL throughout 2006 but an injury to Melbourne's top ruckman Mark Jamar, Smith was suddenly recalled for the semi-final match against Fremantle Football Club. It was Smith's first AFL game in three years, but he could only manage three hitouts, as Melbourne were knocked out of the finals.

Smith was delisted by the Demons at the end of the 2006 season.
