= Alisdair Hogarth =

British-born classical pianist (born 1980)

Alisdair Hogarth (born 14 October 1980) is a British-born classical pianist, best known for his creation and direction of the vocal ensemble, The Prince Consort, which focuses on piano-accompanied song. He also has a background in solo playing and made his concerto debut in 1996, at the age of fifteen, as soloist with the London Philharmonic Orchestra at the Queen Elizabeth Hall broadcast live on Classic FM. He has since performed concertos with a variety of orchestras, including tours of Hungary and the Czech Republic (Rudolfinum). He has broadcast for BBC television, BBC Radio 3 and World Service, Classic FM and New Zealand Concert FM.

After studying music at Cambridge, he went on to claim all major piano prizes at the Royal College of Music in London, where he founded The Prince Consort, named after the road where the college resides.

He has commissioned pieces from Ned Rorem and Stephen Hough. He gave the world-premiere of Rorem's Evidence of Things Unseen at Oxford Lieder Festival in October 2009. He then gave world premieres of Hough's song cycles, Herbstlieder and Other Love Songs (a piano-duet performance with Hough) at Oxford Lieder Festival and Wigmore Hall in 2010 and 2011, respectively. Recordings of these pieces are available performed by The Prince Consort, joined by Hough and Philip Fowke, under the label, Linn Records. Hogarth has commissioned jazz pianist, Jason Rebello, to collaborate with The Prince Consort on a series of Schubert reharmonizations and a reharmonization of Schumann's Dichterliebe song cycle.

Hogarth has performed with Barbara Bonney and Thomas Allen. He is an accompanist to many emerging young artists, such as Jacques Imbrailo, Anna Leese, Jennifer Johnston, Tim Mead, Andrew Staples, and Elisabeth Meister. In commercial spheres, he has worked with Katherine Jenkins, Blake, Lesley Garrett, All Angels, Amici Forever, and X Factor winner Joe McElderry. He has appeared and performed onscreen in the films The Duchess and The Young Victoria.
