= Nicholas J. J. Smith =

Australian philosopher

Nick Smith
- Born: 1972 (age 53–54)
- Awards: Australian Academy of the Humanities fellowship

Education
- Education: Princeton University (PhD), University of Sydney (BA)
- Thesis: Vagueness (2001)
- Doctoral advisor: Gideon Rosen, John P. Burgess

Philosophical work
- Era: 21st-century philosophy
- Region: Western philosophy
- School: Analytic
- Institutions: University of Sydney
- Main interests: philosophy of language, logic
- Notable ideas: degree-based theory of vagueness

Nicholas Jeremy Josef Smith (born 1972) is an Australian philosopher and Professor of Philosophy at the University of Sydney. He is a fellow of the Australian Academy of the Humanities and a former President of the Australasian Association for Logic. Smith is known for his research on logics. He is a lecturer for the popular PHIL1012: Introductory Logic course at the University of Sydney, which broke records in 2021 as the largest course by enrolments in the Faculty of Arts and Social Sciences.

== Books ==
- Logic: The Laws of Truth, Princeton University Press, 2012
- Vagueness and Degrees of Truth, Oxford University Press, 2008

== See also ==
- Temporal paradox
- Grandfather paradox
- Time travel
