= Nicky Smith =

Nicky Smith or Nicola Smith may refer to:

- Nicola Smith (born 1949), English bridge player
- Nicky Smith (RAF officer) (born c. 1969), British RAF officer, the first woman to command an RAF flying squadron
- Nicky Smith (English footballer) (1969–2026), English footballer
- Nicky Smith (New Zealand footballer) (born 1980), New Zealand woman international footballer
- Nicky Smith (rugby union) (born 1994), Welsh rugby union player
