= High-performance fuzzy computing =

High-performance fuzzy computing (HPFC) is those technologies able to exploit supercomputers and computer clusters to perform high performance fuzzy logic computations. Thus HPFC is just a special case of the much more general high-performance computing. In the specific case of fuzzy logic, however, there exist more traditional ways to achieve high performance, that could be considered HPFC but in a broader sense, like the hardware implementations on DSP or FPGA. More recently, another alternative has emerged: fuzzy computing on GPU.
