= Peter J. Bentley =

British author and computer scientist

- Born: 16 May 1972 (age 54); Colchester, UK
- Awards: Edge of Computation Prize Nominee (2005)
- Scientific career
- Fields: Computer Science
- Workplaces: University College London; KAIST

Prof Peter John Bentley (born 16 May 1972) is a British author and computer scientist based at University College London.

Peter J. Bentley is Professor of Digital Biology at UCL, a visiting professor at Autodesk and a collaborating professor at KAIST. He is also a popular science author and consultant. He was a contributing editor for WIRED UK and was the monthly host of the Royal Institution's café scientifique. He currently writes for BBC Science Focus magazine.

== Early life and education ==
Bentley was born in Colchester, England. he achieved a BSc in artificial intelligence from the University of Essex (supervised by Edward Tsang) and a PhD in evolutionary design (supervised by Jonathan Wakefield) at the age of 24. His doctorate thesis was entitled Generic Evolutionary Design of Solid Objects using a Genetic Algorithm and pioneered the use of evolutionary computation for generative design.

== Career ==
Bentley is head of the Digital Biology Interest Group at the Department of Computer Science, University College London. His research focuses on evolutionary computation, artificial life, swarm intelligence, artificial immune systems, artificial neural networks and other types of biologically inspired computing, which he terms Digital Biology. He participates in science festivals and public events, for example he organised and chaired the debate on Complexity and Evolution held as part of the Genetic and Evolutionary Computation Conference at the Natural History Museum in July 2007 with Richard Dawkins, Steve Jones, Lewis Wolpert. His research has been described in several articles of New Scientist. His recent research focuses on morphological computation and novel architectures designed for natural computation based on evolution, developmental and self-assembling systems.

He received extensive publicity for his iPhone application iStethoscope, which was developed in collaboration with cardiologists in USA. The app has been used to gather heart sounds from people around the world in a research project to enable computers to diagnose heart disease automatically using machine learning.

He cofounded the online marketplace Kazoova Ltd which specialises in quirky and unusual activities and was Chief Technology Officer of AI company Braintree Ltd from 2016 to 2019. Through his work as advisor for thesqua.re marketplace he helped create the sustainability measure EcoGrade.

His notable PhD students include Siavash Haroun Mahdavi, who founded Within Technologies formerly Complex Matters, acquired by Autodesk in 2014, with generative design subsequently incorporated into several Autodesk products. Bentley became a visiting professor at Autodesk Research in 2020.

His books include the critically acclaimed ‘’Digital Biology’’, ‘’Undercover Scientist’’ and ‘’Digitized’’.

== Popular books ==
- Artificial Intelligence in Byte-sized Chunks, ISBN 978-1-78929-656-3
- 10 Short Lessons in Artificial Intelligence and Robotics, ISBN 978-1-78929-216-9
- Digitized: The science of computers and how it shapes our world, ISBN 978-0-19-969379-5
- The Undercover Scientist: Investigating the Mishaps of Everyday Life, ISBN 978-1-84794-523-5
- Why Sh*t Happens: The Science of a Really Bad Day, ISBN 978-1-59486-956-3 (US version of The Undercover Scientist)
- The Invention of Numbers. From Zeroes to Heroes: The secrets of numbers and how they created our world, ISBN 978-1-84403-911-1 (Revised paperback edition of The Book of Numbers)
- The Book of Numbers: The Secret of Numbers and How They Changed the World, ISBN 1-55407-361-8
- Digital Biology. How nature is transforming our technology and our lives, ISBN 0-7432-0447-6

== Academic books ==
- Evolutionary Design by Computers, ISBN 1-55860-605-X
- Creative Evolutionary Systems, ISBN 1-55860-673-4
- On Growth, Form and Computers, ISBN 0-12-428765-4
- The PhD Application Handbook, ISBN 0-335-21952-7

== Academic proceedings ==
- Artificial Immune Systems. Proceedings of the Seventh International Conference (ICARIS 2008), ISBN 978-3-540-85071-7
- Advances in Artificial Life. Proceedings of the Eighth European Conference (ECAL 2005), ISBN 3-540-28848-1
- Artificial Immune Systems. Proceedings of the Fourth International Conference (ICARIS 2005), ISBN 3-540-28175-4
- Artificial Immune Systems. Proceedings of the Third International Conference (ICARIS 2004), ISBN 3-540-23097-1
- Evolvability, Genetics & Development in Natural and Constructed Systems: Abstracts of the EPSRC Evolvability Network Symposium, August 2003
- Artificial Immune Systems. Proceedings of the Second International Conference (ICARIS 2003), ISBN 3-540-40766-9
- Artificial Immune Systems. Proceedings of the First International Conference (ICARIS), ISBN 1-902671-32-5
- Proceedings of the AISB99 Symposium on Creative Evolutionary Systems, ISBN 1-902956-03-6
- AID 1998 1st Workshop Notes on Evolutionary Design, July 1998

== See also ==
- Artificial life
- Evolutionary Computation
- Norman Packard
- Thomas S. Ray
- David E. Goldberg
- John Koza
