= Peter Bentley =

Peter Bentley may refer to:

- Peter Bentley (businessman) (1930–2021), Canadian businessman and chancellor of the University of Northern British Columbia
- Peter J. Bentley (born 1972), British author and computer scientist
- Peter Bentley Sr. (1805–1875), mayor of Jersey City, New Jersey

== See also ==
- Peter Bently (born 1960), British children's writer
