= Jieh-Haur Chen =

Taiwanese civil engineering academic

Jieh-Haur Chen, Ph.D., F.IET is a professor. Chen (陳介豪) is a Distinguished Professor of National Central University (NCU), Taiwan, where he teaches and performs research related to construction management, computational intelligence, and engineering finance. He is currently serving as the Associate Dean of College of Engineering in NCU, he has published more than 100 SCI/SSCI journal articles and 200 peer-reviewed conference papers. Prof. Chen’s accomplishments have been recognized through numerous honors. He is a Fellow of the APEC Society of Project Forensics, the Safety and Health Association of Taiwan, and the Institution of Engineering and Technology (F.IET). Most recently, he has been listed among the career-long Top 2% of scientists worldwide by Stanford University and Elsevier since 2025.

== Education and career ==
He received his B.S. degree in Civil Engineering from National Central University, his master's degree in Project Management from Northwestern University, and his Ph.D. degree in Civil Engineering (construction) from the University of Wisconsin-Madison.
