= Artificial immune system =

Class of rule-based machine learning systems

Artificial immune systems (AIS) are a class of rule-based machine learning systems inspired by the principles and processes of the vertebrate immune system. The algorithms are typically modeled after the immune system's characteristics of learning and memory for problem-solving, specifically for biological computational techniques.

== Definition ==
The field of artificial immune systems (AIS) is concerned with abstracting the structure and function of the immune system to computational systems, and investigating the application of these systems towards solving computational problems from fields like mathematics, engineering, and information technology. AIS is a sub-field of biologically inspired computing, and natural computation, with interests in machine learning and belonging to the broader field of artificial intelligence, such as artificial general intelligence.

Artificial immune systems (AIS) are adaptive systems, inspired by theoretical immunology and observed immune functions, principles and models, which are applied to problem solving.

AIS is distinct from computational immunology and theoretical biology that are concerned with simulating immunology using computational and mathematical models towards better understanding the immune system, although such models initiated the field of AIS and continue to provide a fertile ground for inspiration. Finally, the field of AIS is not concerned with the investigation of the immune system as a substrate for computation, unlike other fields such as DNA computing.

== History ==
AIS emerged in the mid-1980s with articles authored by Farmer, Packard and Perelson (1986) and Bersini and Varela (1990) on immune networks. However, it was only in the mid-1990s that AIS became a field in its own right. Forrest et al. (on negative selection) and Kephart et al. published their first papers on AIS in 1994, and Dasgupta conducted extensive studies on Negative Selection Algorithms. Hunt and Cooke started the works on Immune Network models in 1995; Timmis and Neal continued this work and made some improvements. De Castro & Von Zuben's and Nicosia & Cutello's work (on clonal selection) became notable in 2002. The first book on Artificial Immune Systems was edited by Dasgupta in 1999.

Currently, new ideas along AIS lines, such as danger theory and algorithms inspired by the innate immune system, are also being explored. Although some believe that these new ideas do not yet offer any truly 'new' abstract, over and above existing AIS algorithms. This, however, is hotly debated, and the debate provides one of the main driving forces for AIS development at the moment. Other recent developments involve the exploration of degeneracy in AIS models, which is motivated by its hypothesized role in open ended learning and evolution.

Originally AIS set out to find efficient abstractions of processes found in the immune system but, more recently, it is becoming interested in modelling the biological processes and in applying immune algorithms to bioinformatics problems.

In 2008, Dasgupta and Nino published a textbook on immunological computation which presents a compendium of up-to-date work related to immunity-based techniques and describes a wide variety of applications.

== Techniques ==
The common techniques are inspired by specific immunological theories that explain the function and behavior of the mammalian adaptive immune system.

- Clonal selection algorithm: A class of algorithms inspired by the clonal selection theory of acquired immunity that explains how B and T lymphocytes improve their response to antigens over time called affinity maturation. These algorithms focus on the Darwinian attributes of the theory where selection is inspired by the affinity of antigen–antibody interactions, reproduction is inspired by cell division, and variation is inspired by somatic hypermutation. Clonal selection algorithms are most commonly applied to optimization and pattern recognition domains, some of which resemble parallel hill climbing and the genetic algorithm without the recombination operator.
- Negative selection algorithm: Inspired by the positive and negative selection processes that occur during the maturation of T cells in the thymus called T cell tolerance. Negative selection refers to the identification and deletion (apoptosis) of self-reacting cells, that is T cells that may select for and attack self tissues. This class of algorithms are typically used for classification and pattern recognition problem domains where the problem space is modeled in the complement of available knowledge. For example, in the case of an anomaly detection domain the algorithm prepares a set of exemplar pattern detectors trained on normal (non-anomalous) patterns that model and detect unseen or anomalous patterns.
- Immune network algorithms: Algorithms inspired by the idiotypic network theory proposed by Niels Kaj Jerne that describes the regulation of the immune system by anti-idiotypic antibodies (antibodies that select for other antibodies). This class of algorithms focus on the network graph structures involved where antibodies (or antibody producing cells) represent the nodes and the training algorithm involves growing or pruning edges between the nodes based on affinity (similarity in the problems representation space). Immune network algorithms have been used in clustering, data visualization, control, and optimization domains, and share properties with artificial neural networks.
- Dendritic cell algorithms: The dendritic cell algorithm (DCA) is an example of an immune inspired algorithm developed using a multi-scale approach. This algorithm is based on an abstract model of dendritic cells (DCs). The DCA is abstracted and implemented through a process of examining and modeling various aspects of DC function, from the molecular networks present within the cell to the behaviour exhibited by a population of cells as a whole. Within the DCA information is granulated at different layers, achieved through multi-scale processing.

== See also ==
- Biologically inspired computing
- Computational immunology
- Computational intelligence
- Evolutionary computation
- Immunocomputing
- Natural computation
- Swarm intelligence
- Learning classifier system
- Rule-based machine learning
