= Biological computation =

Conceptual computation method

The concept of biological computation proposes that living organisms perform computations, and that as such, abstract ideas of information and computation may be key to understanding biology. As a field, biological computation can include the study of computations performed by life, the design of algorithms inspired by biology, the design and engineering of computational devices using synthetic biology, and computer methods for biological data.

According to Dominique Chu, Mikhail Prokopenko, and J. Christian J. Ray, "the most important class of natural computers can be found in biological systems that perform computation on multiple levels. From molecular and cellular information processing networks to ecologies, economies and brains, life computes. Despite ubiquitous agreement on this fact going back as far as von Neumann automata and McCulloch–Pitts neural nets, we so far lack principles to understand rigorously how computation is done in living, or active, matter".

Logical circuits can be built with slime moulds. Distributed systems experiments have used them to approximate motorway graphs. The slime mould Physarum polycephalum is able to compute high-quality approximate solutions to the Traveling Salesman Problem, a combinatorial test with exponentially increasing complexity, in linear time. Fungi such as basidiomycetes can also be used to build logical circuits. In a proposed fungal computer, information is represented by spikes of electrical activity, computation is implemented in a mycelium network, and an interface is realized via fruit bodies.

== See also ==
- Wetware
- Biological neural network
- Artificial neuron
- Computational biology
- Biological computing
- Zero player game
- Reservoir computation
- DNA computation
- Evolutionary computation
- Autonomic computation
- Amorphous computation
- Hyperdimensional computation
