= Natural Computing (journal) =

- Discipline: Computer science
- Language: English

Publication details
- History: 2002–present
- Publisher: Springer Verlag
- Frequency: Quarterly

Standard abbreviations
- ISO 4: Nat. Comput.

Indexing
- ISSN: 1567-7818

Links
- Journal homepage

Natural Computing is a scientific journal covering natural computing research. It has been published quarterly by Springer Verlag (Springer Netherlands) in print (ISSN 1567-7818) and online (ISSN 1572-9796) since 2002.

"Natural Computing refers to computational processes observed in nature, and human-designed computing inspired by nature ... molecular computing and quantum computing ... use of algorithms to consider evolution as a computational process, and neural networks in light of computational trends in brain research."

It includes 19 open access articles as of 19 June 2016 and has an impact factor of 1.310.
