= Alcherio Martinoli =

Swiss roboticist and professor

- Education: EPFL, ETH
- Children: 2
- Scientific career
- Fields: Robotics, computer science
- Workplaces: EPFL, Caltech
- Thesis: Swarm Intelligence in Autonomous Collective Robotics: From Tools to the Analysis and Synthesis of Distributed Control Strategies (1999)
- Doctoral advisor: Jean-Daniel Nicoud
- Notable students: Nikolaus Correll
- Website: people.epfl.ch/alcherio.martinoli

Alcherio Martinoli is a roboticist and a full professor at the École polytechnique fédérale de Lausanne (EPFL) in the School of Architecture, Civil and Environmental Engineering where he heads the Distributed Systems and Algorithms Laboratory.

== Biography ==
Martinoli received his PhD degree in computer science in 1999 at the École polytechnique fédérale de Lausanne (EPFL) working under Jean-Daniel Nicoud. Martinoli did a post-doc with Rodney M. Goodman at Caltech, where he headed the Collective Robotics Group. In 2007, he joined EPFL as an SNSF Assistant Professor in School of Information and Communication. He has moved to School of Architecture, Civil and Environmental Engineering in 2008 as an associate professor. He became a full Professor in 2024.

He is the recipient of a Swiss National Science Foundation Young Investigator Award as well as the 2001 KiTi prize for young Swiss-Italian researchers who have distinguished themselves in the field of science, art, or humanities, as well as a "Best Paper Award" at the 2006 Conference on Distributed Autonomous Robotic Systems (DARS)

== Work ==
Martinoli's research interests are in multi-robot systems, swarm robotics, swarm Intelligence, and self-organization with applications to transportation systems and large-scale networks of sensors and actuators. Martinoli is widely recognized for his work on distributed odor localization, modeling and designing swarm robotic systems, and mixed systems consisting of animals and robots, which has been cited more than 5000 times.

Martinoli and his laboratory have also taken a leading role in various open-source projects affecting the robotics community at large, most notably the software Swistrack, a multi-object tracking system for single and multi-camera systems, the Khepera III Toolbox for the Khepera III robot, and the e-Puck mobile robot in collaboration with Francesco Mondada.
