= Dynamicism =

Dynamicism, also termed dynamic cognition, is an approach in cognitive science popularized by the work of philosopher Tim van Gelder. It argues that differential equations and dynamical systems are more suited to modeling cognition rather than the commonly used ideas of symbolicism, connectionism, or traditional computer models. It is closely related to dynamical neuroscience.
