= Nikolaus Correll =

German roboticist and researcher (born 1977)

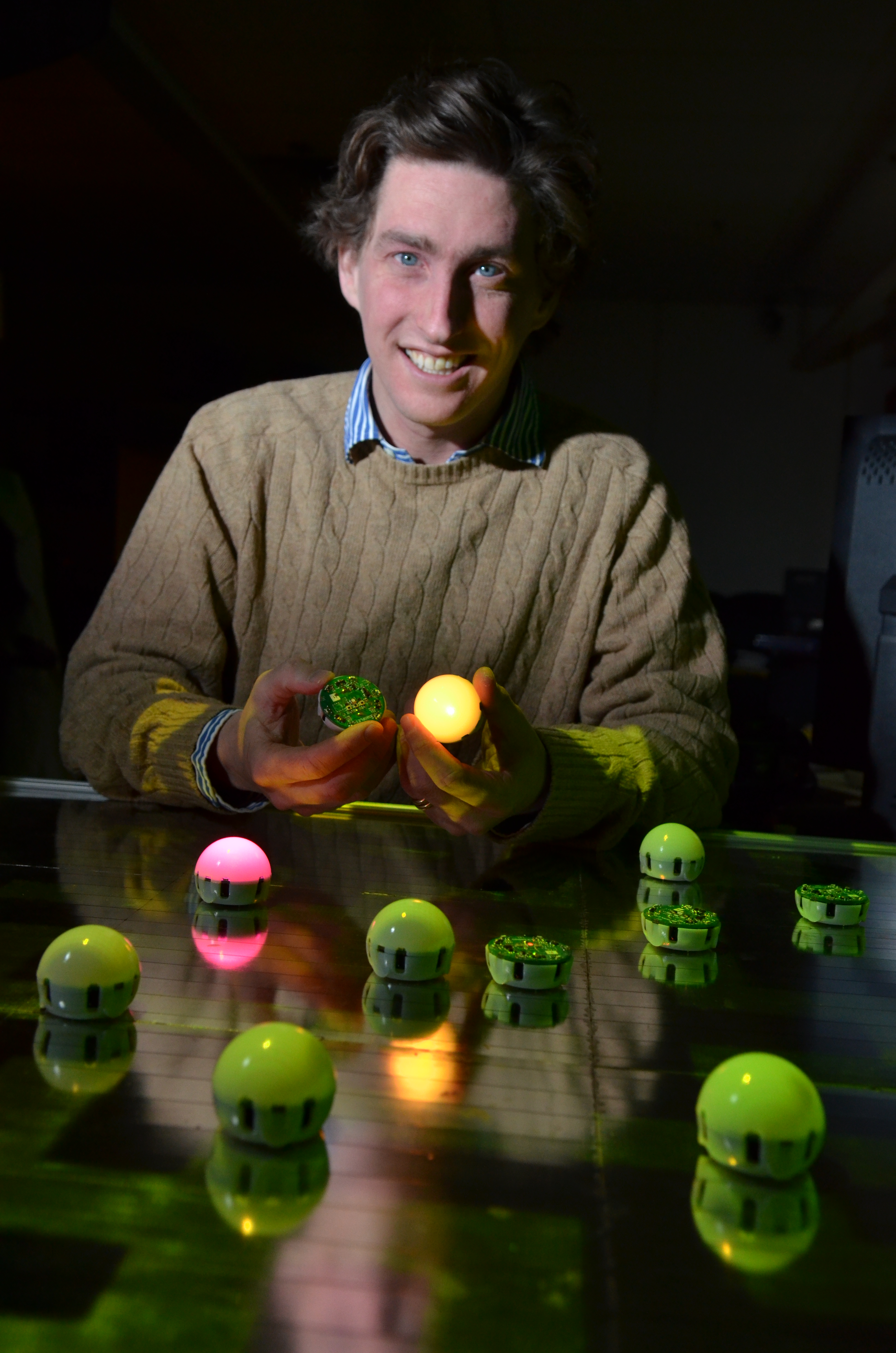
- Correll in 2012
- Born: 1977 (age 48–49); Munich, Germany
- Citizenship: German
- Education: EPFL, ETH
- Children: 4
- Awards: NSF CAREER award, NASA Early Career Faculty Fellowship
- Scientific career
- Fields: Robotics, Computer Science
- Workplaces: University of Colorado
- Thesis: Coordination Schemes for Distributed Boundary Coverage with a Swarm of Miniature Robots: Synthesis, Analysis and Experimental Validation (2007)
- Doctoral advisor: Alcherio Martinoli
- Other academic advisors: Daniela Rus
- Website: correll.cs.colorado.edu

Nikolaus Correll (born 1977 in Munich, Germany) is a roboticist and a professor at the University of Notre Dame where he holds the Viola D. Hank Chair in Aerospace and Mechanical Engineering, and an adoint professor at the University of Colorado at Boulder in the Department of Computer Science. Correll has been the founder and CTO of Robotic Materials Inc.

== Biography ==
Correll obtained a Diploma (Masters) in Electrical Engineering from the Eidgenössische Technische Hochschule Zürich. He spent the first two years of his studies at the Technische Hochschule München, participated in the Erasmus Programme to spend a semester at Lunds Tekniska Hogsköla working with Rolf Johansson and wrote his Diploma thesis at Caltech working with Alcherio Martinoli and Joel Burdick.

Correll received his Dr. és science (Phd) degree in Computer Science in 2007 at the École polytechnique fédérale de Lausanne (EPFL) working under Alcherio Martinoli. Correll did a post-doc with Prof. Daniela Rus at Massachusetts Institute of Technology's Computer Science and Artificial Intelligence Laboratory. He became an assistant professor at the University of Colorado at Boulder in 2009, was promoted to associate professor with tenure in 2017.

Correll is the recipient of a 2012 NSF CAREER award, the 2012 NASA Early Career Faculty Fellowship, and a 2016 Provost Faculty Achievement Award. He is a senior member of the IEEE.

== Work ==
Correll's research is on Swarm Robotics, Swarm Intelligence, and Self-organization. He is using these concepts to equip composite materials with intelligence and enabling robots with autonomy, for which he coined the term Robotic Materials and founded a company of the same name, which markets robotic manipulation systems based on smart tactile sensors, skins and hands.

Correll is also an active researcher in robotics education and is the author of an open-source, collaborative textbook "Introduction to Autonomous Robots".

Correll's work on robotic materials has received worldwide media attention including the Associated Press, Neue Zuercher Zeitung, the IEEE Signal Processing Magazine, and Popular Science, among others.

Correll has been an advisor to TempAlert (acquired, NASDAQ: DGII), TABS, and Occam Robotics, and currently to Robotise SE.

== Academic legacy ==
Since starting at the University of Colorado in 2009, two of Correll's former PhD students have taken up faculty jobs at PhD-granting institutions:

- Erik Komendera, PhD 2014, Assistant Professor in Mechanical Engineering at Virginia Tech
- Michael Otte, PhD 2011, Assistant Professor in Aerospace Engineering at the University of Maryland, College Park
