= YourView =

Australian not-for-profit website

- Company type: Not-for-profit
- Website type: Debate, deliberative democracy
- Available in: English
- Founded: May 2012
- Headquarters: Melbourne, Australia
- Owner: OurView Foundation
- Founder: Tim van Gelder
- Website: yourview.org.au
- Current status: Inactive

YourView is an Australian not-for-profit debate website, founded in 2012.

Drawing upon the aims and principles of deliberative democracy theory, the website promotes considered debate in order to establish the "collective viewpoint" on political and social issues.

== Organisation ==
YourView is supported by the not-for-profit Ourview Foundation (ACN 154 763 970), established in 2011 by the Australian philosopher Tim Van Gelder in collaboration with the public intellectual Paul Monk. It is funded by voluntary donations.

The site was launched publicly in May 2012 and was maintained and developed by a staff of volunteers based in Melbourne. The website is currently inactive, and the project on hold.

== Content ==
YourView drew on ideas developed within the deliberative democracy movement, which promotes rational deliberation as a means of forming opinions and guiding policy decisions.

Users initially voted for or against a proposition based on a current issue, and were subsequently invited to post comments to justify their adopted stance. Each debate was prefaced by an "explainer", which provided basic information about the issue being discussed including an outline of key arguments.

As part of its objective to promote constructive and informed debate, YourView used an algorithm to assign each user a credibility score; the algorithm aimed to quantify a series of "epistemic virtues" that collectively determined the extent to which an individual user has contributed to the deliberative process. The raw "for-against" vote was weighted by user credibility scores to compute a "collective wisdom" metric, thereby setting it apart from purely aggregative opinion polling. Details about which factors influence the algorithm were not published, which reduced the model's transparency but aimed to prevent users from gaming the system.
