= Robotic materials =

Robotic materials are composite materials that combine sensing, actuation, computation, and communication in a repeatable or amorphous pattern. Robotic materials can be considered computational metamaterials in that they extend the original definition of a metamaterial as "macroscopic composites having a man-made, three-dimensional, periodic cellular architecture designed to produce an optimized combination, not available in nature, of two or more responses to specific excitation" by being fully programmable. That is, unlike in a conventional metamaterial, the relationship between a specific excitation and response is governed by sensing, actuation, and a computer program that implements the desired logic.

== History ==
The idea of creating materials that embed computation is closely related to the concept of programmable matter, a term coined in 1991 by Toffoli and Margolus, describing dense arrays of computing elements that could solve complex finite-element like simulations of material systems, and then later developed to describe a class of materials consisting of identical, mobile building blocks, also known as catoms that are fully reconfigurable, therefore allowing materials to arbitrarily change their physical properties.

Robotic materials build up on the original concept of programmable matter, but focus on the structural properties of the embedding polymers without claim of universal property changes. Here the term "robotic" refers to the confluence of sensing, actuation, and computation, and was coined by Nikolaus Correll and his students in the Science article "Materials that couple sensing, actuation, and computation".

== Applications ==
Robotic materials allow for off-loading computation inside the material, most notably signal processing that arises during high-bandwidth sensing applications or feedback control that is required by fine-grained distributed actuation. Examples for such applications include camouflage, shape change, load balancing, and robotic skins as well as equipping robots with more autonomy by off-loading some of the signal processing and controls into the material, creating "materials that make robots smart"

== Research challenges ==
Research in robotic materials ranges from the device-level and manufacturing to the distributed algorithms that equip robotic materials with intelligence. As such it intersects the fields of composite materials, sensor networks, distributed algorithms, and due to the scale of the involved computation, swarm intelligence. Unlike any individual field, the design of the structure, sensors, actuators, communication infrastructure, and distributed algorithms are tightly intertwined. For example, the material properties of the structural material will affect how signals to be sensed propagate through the material, at which distance computational elements need to be spaced, and what signal processing needs to be done. Similarly, structural properties are closely related to the actual embedding of computing and communication infrastructure. Capturing these effects therefore requires interdisciplinary collaboration between materials, computer science, and robotics. From a material science perspective, a particular challenge lies in materials that enable the instant creation of complex objects and their transfiguration on command. An overview of different approaches for such materials is provided by Kaya et al.
