= University of Colorado Boulder Computer Science Department =

Coordinates: 40.00746°N 105.26283°W

Department of Computer Science
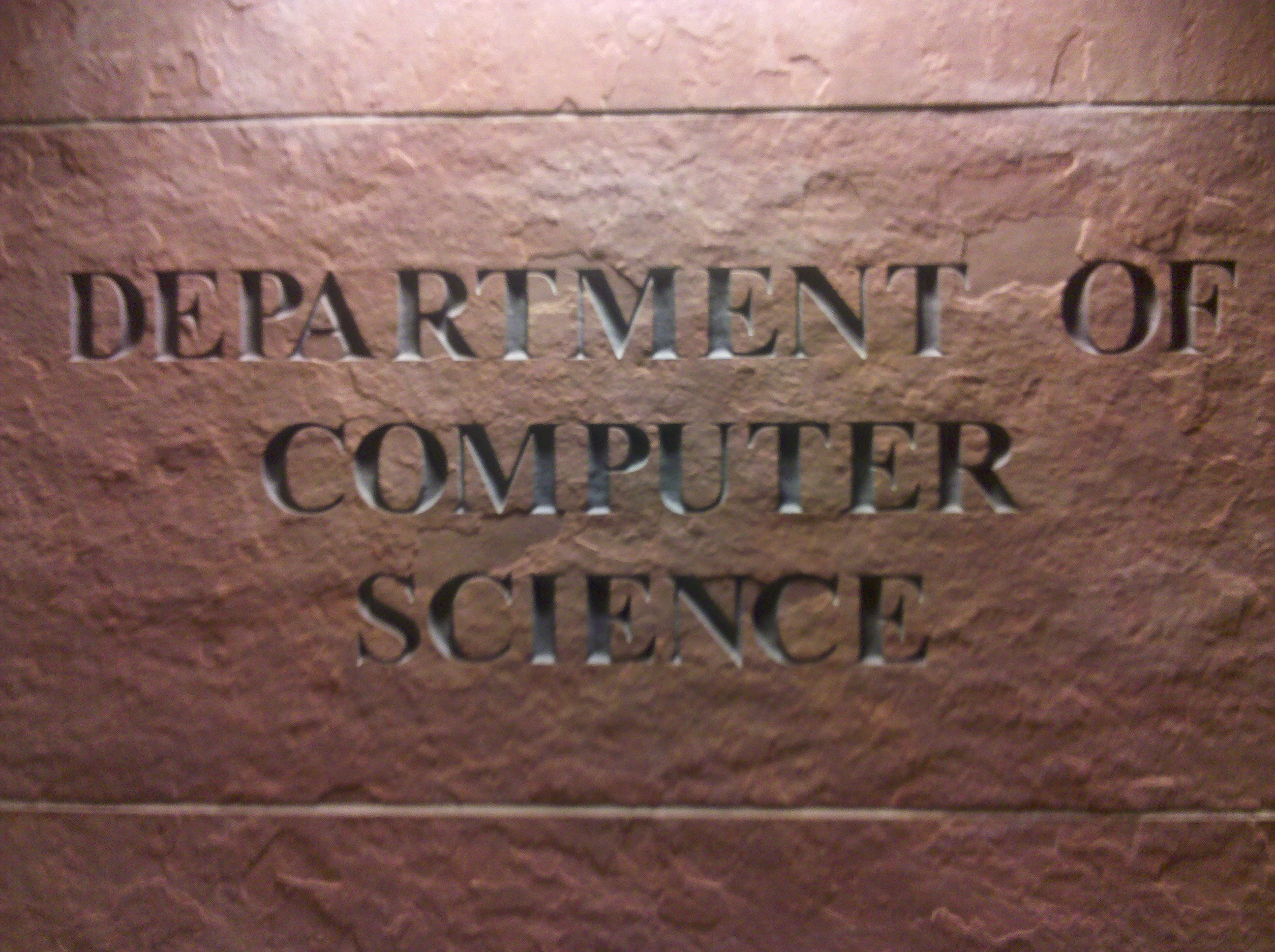
- Entrance to the department in the Engineering Center at the University of Colorado Boulder
- Established: 1970, Officially adopted by the College of Engineering and Applied Science in 1980
- Affiliations: University of Colorado Boulder
- Location: Boulder, Colorado, United States
- Campus: Boulder Main Campus
- Website: http://www.colorado.edu/cs/

The Computer Science Department at the University of Colorado Boulder is an academic department in the College of Engineering and Applied Science focusing on the teaching and research of Computer Science. The department was founded in 1970 and was later inducted into the College of Engineering and Applied Science in 1980. The department offers both undergraduate and graduate degree programs as well as a minor in Computer Science.

== Academic programs ==
=== Undergraduate ===
The department offers a Bachelor of Science in computer science as well as a minor. The four year undergraduate degree program typically culminates in a year-long senior projects course in which industry groups submit projects for groups of students to work on. The department also offers a working and studying area known as the Computer Science Educational Labs (CSEL). It is a common gathering place for students enrolled in at least one computer science course at the university, providing computing resources in the form of Ubuntu workstations. A student-led group called the Computer Science Undergraduate Advisory Committee (CSUAC) works with students and faculty to improve the undergraduate program and provides resources such as career fairs and other community events.

=== Graduate ===
The graduate program offers either a MS or ME or a Ph.D. The program places a high priority on research and the placement of its students in future careers. The department is supported by $4 million annually in the form of research grants primarily from federal agencies such as the National Science Foundation. Graduate students research in many areas, including human-computer interaction, neural networks, numerical and parallel computation, databases, networks, software engineering, systems, and theoretical computer science.

== Research ==
Currently, the department has 34 research faculty and 18 administrative staff. Some of the more prevalent realms of research include computer architecture, mobile computing, computer security, computational biology, robotics, algorithm design, artificial intelligence, web engineering, programming languages, computer-supported cooperative work, machine learning, lifelong learning and design, speech and language processing, and scientific computing.

== Achievements and awards ==
The department has received four successive five-year awards from the NSF and Comparative Effectiveness Research to support both research and infrastructure. The department also received the largest ever gift to a public university in the form of $250 million to fund research to improve the lives of people diagnosed with cognitive disabilities. The department is a member of the ARPA National Consortium in High Performance Computing. Apple co-founder Steve Wozniak donated money to create the "Woz Lab" within the Computer Science Education Lab. Wozniak studied at the university in the late 1960s.

== Notable faculty and alumni ==
- Alan Kay
- Andrzej Ehrenfeucht
- David Haussler
- Eugene Myers
- Steve Wozniak, honorary Doctor of Engineering
- Clarence Ellis
