= Bio-inspired computing =

Solving problems using biological models

Bio-inspired computing, short for biologically inspired computing, is a field of study which seeks to solve computer science problems using models of biology. It relates to connectionism, social behavior, and emergence. Within computer science, bio-inspired computing relates to artificial intelligence and machine learning. Bio-inspired computing is a major subset of natural computation.

== History ==
Early Ideas

The ideas behind biological computing trace back to 1936 with the first description of an abstract computer, which is now known as a Turing machine. Turing firstly described the abstract construct using a biological specimen. Turing imagined a mathematician that has three important attributes. He always has a pencil with an eraser, an unlimited number of papers and a working set of eyes. The eyes allow the mathematician to see and perceive any symbols written on the paper while the pencil allows him to write and erase any symbols that he wants. Lastly, the unlimited paper allows him to store anything he wants in memory. Using these ideas he was able to describe an abstraction of the modern digital computer. However, Turing mentioned that anything that can perform these functions can be considered such a machine and he even said that even electricity should not be required to describe digital computation and machine thinking in general.

Neural Networks

First described in 1943 by Warren McCulloch and Walter Pitts, neural networks are a prevalent example of biological systems inspiring the creation of computer algorithms. They first mathematically described that a system of simplistic neurons was able to produce simple logical operations such as logical conjunction, disjunction and negation. They further showed that a system of neural networks can be used to carry out any calculation that requires finite memory. Around 1970 the research around neural networks slowed down and many consider a 1969 book by Marvin Minsky and Seymour Papert as the main cause. Their book showed that neural network models were able only model systems that are based on Boolean functions that are true only after a certain threshold value. Such functions are also known as threshold functions. The book also showed that a large amount of systems cannot be represented as such meaning that a large amount of systems cannot be modeled by neural networks. Another book by James Rumelhart and David McClelland in 1986 brought neural networks back to the spotlight by demonstrating the linear back-propagation algorithm something that allowed the development of multi-layered neural networks that did not adhere to those limits.

Ant Colonies

In 1979, Douglas Hofstadter described a biological system capable of performing intelligent computations even if the individual components were not intelligent. He used ant colonies as an example, showing that collective behavior can result in problem-solving abilities, a phenomenon known as emergent behavior. In 2009, Azimi et al. developed the ant colony algorithm, a clustering method that can determine the number of clusters and produce results competitive with traditional algorithms. Additionally, Hölder and Wilson (2009) analyzed historical data and concluded that ants have evolved to function as a single “superorganism” colony, which inspired further research into group-based evolutionary algorithm.

== Areas of research ==
Some areas of study in biologically inspired computing, and their biological counterparts:

Bio-Inspired Computing Topic	Biological Inspiration
Evolutionary Algorithms	Evolution
Biodegradability prediction	Biodegradation
Cellular Automata	Life
Emergence	Ants, termites, bees, wasps
Artificial neural networks	Biological neural networks
Artificial life	Life
Artificial immune system	Immune system
Rendering (computer graphics)	Patterning and rendering of animal skins, bird feathers, mollusk shells and bacterial colonies
Lindenmayer systems	Plant structures
Communication networks and communication protocols	Epidemiology
Membrane computers	Intra-membrane molecular processes in the living cell
Excitable media	Forest fires, "the wave", heart conditions, axons
Sensor networks	Sensory organs
Learning classifier systems	Cognition, evolution

=== Population-Based Bio-Inspired Algorithms ===
Bio-inspired computing, which work on a population of possible solutions in the context of evolutionary algorithms or in the context of swarm intelligence algorithms, are subdivided into Population Based Bio-Inspired Algorithms (PBBIA). They include Evolutionary Algorithms, Particle Swarm Optimization, Ant colony optimization algorithms and Artificial bee colony algorithms.

==== Virtual Insect Example ====
Bio-inspired computing can be used to train a virtual insect. The insect is trained to navigate in an unknown terrain for finding food equipped with six simple rules:

- turn right for target-and-obstacle left;
- turn left for target-and-obstacle right;
- turn left for target-left-obstacle-right;
- turn right for target-right-obstacle-left;
- turn left for target-left without obstacle;
- turn right for target-right without obstacle.

The virtual insect controlled by the trained spiking neural network can find food after training in any unknown terrain. After several generations of rule application it is usually the case that some forms of complex behaviour emerge. Complexity gets built upon complexity until the result is something markedly complex, and quite often completely counterintuitive from what the original rules would be expected to produce (see complex systems). For this reason, when modeling the neural network, it is necessary to accurately model an in vivo network, by live collection of "noise" coefficients that can be used to refine statistical inference and extrapolation as system complexity increases.

Natural evolution is a good analogy to this method–the rules of evolution (selection, recombination/reproduction, mutation and more recently transposition) are in principle simple rules, yet over millions of years have produced remarkably complex organisms. A similar technique is used in genetic algorithms.

=== Brain-inspired computing ===
Brain-inspired computing refers to computational models and methods that are mainly based on the mechanism of the brain, rather than completely imitating the brain. The goal is to enable the machine to realize various cognitive abilities and coordination mechanisms of human beings in a brain-inspired manner, and finally achieve or exceed human intelligence level.

==== Relationship with neuroscience ====
Brain-inspired computing draws on ideas about learning, memory and information processing in the brain to guide the design of artificial systems. Biological findings can inform computational models at multiple scales, from the properties of neurons and synapses to connections within neural networks and interactions between brain regions.

==== Unexpected convergence between the brain and AI ====
At the algorithmic level, brain-inspired computing seeks computational principles that can be adapted to artificial systems. Researchers have compared brain circuits with generative AI systems to explore how predictive models can be used both to process sensory information and to generate actions.

==== Brain-inspired chip ====
Broadly speaking, brain-inspired chip refers to a chip designed with reference to the structure of human brain neurons and the cognitive mode of human brain. Obviously, the "neuromorphic chip" is a brain-inspired chip that focuses on the design of the chip structure with reference to the human brain neuron model and its tissue structure, which represents a major direction of brain-inspired chip research. Along with the rise and development of “brain plans” in various countries, a large number of research results on neuromorphic chips have emerged, which have received extensive international attention and are well known to the academic community and the industry. For example, EU-backed SpiNNaker and BrainScaleS, Stanford's Neurogrid, IBM's TrueNorth, and Qualcomm's Zeroth.

TrueNorth is a brain-inspired chip that IBM has been developing for nearly 12 years. The US DARPA program has been funding IBM to develop pulsed neural network chips for intelligent processing since 2008. In 2011, IBM first developed two cognitive silicon prototypes by simulating brain structures that could learn and process information like the brain. Each neuron of a brain-inspired chip is cross-connected with massive parallelism. In 2014, IBM released a second-generation brain-inspired chip called "TrueNorth." Compared with the first generation brain-inspired chips, the performance of the TrueNorth chip has increased dramatically, and the number of neurons has increased from 256 to 1 million; the number of programmable synapses has increased from 262,144 to 256 million; Subsynaptic operation with a total power consumption of 70 mW and a power consumption of 20 mW per square centimeter. At the same time, TrueNorth handles a nuclear volume of only 1/15 of the first generation of brain chips. At present, IBM has developed a prototype of a neuron computer that uses 16 TrueNorth chips with real-time video processing capabilities. The super-high indicators and excellence of the TrueNorth chip have caused a great stir in the academic world at the beginning of its release.

In 2012, the Institute of Computing Technology of the Chinese Academy of Sciences(CAS) and the French Inria collaborated to develop the first chip in the world to support the deep neural network processor architecture chip "Cambrian". The technology has won the best international conferences in the field of computer architecture, ASPLOS and MICRO, and its design method and performance have been recognized internationally. The chip can be used as an outstanding representative of the research direction of brain-inspired chips.

==== Research challenges ====
===== Unclear Brain mechanism cognition =====
The human brain is a product of evolution. Although its structure and information processing mechanism are constantly optimized, compromises in the evolution process are inevitable. The cranial nervous system is a multi-scale structure. There are still several important problems in the mechanism of information processing at each scale, such as the fine connection structure of neuron scales and the mechanism of brain-scale feedback. Therefore, even a comprehensive calculation of the number of neurons and synapses is only 1/1000 of the size of the human brain, and it is still very difficult to study at the current level of scientific research. Recent advances in brain simulation linked individual variability in human cognitive processing speed and fluid intelligence to the balance of excitation and inhibition in structural brain networks, functional connectivity, winner-take-all decision-making and attractor working memory.

===== Unclear Brain-inspired computational models and algorithms =====
In the future research of cognitive brain computing model, it is necessary to model the brain information processing system based on multi-scale brain neural system data analysis results, construct a brain-inspired multi-scale neural network computing model, and simulate multi-modality of brain in multi-scale. Intelligent behavioral ability such as perception, self-learning and memory, and choice. Machine learning algorithms are not flexible and require high-quality sample data that is manually labeled on a large scale. Training models require a lot of computational overhead. Brain-inspired artificial intelligence still lacks advanced cognitive ability and inferential learning ability.

===== Constrained Computational architecture and capabilities =====
Most of the existing brain-inspired chips are still based on the research of von Neumann architecture, and most of the chip manufacturing materials are still using traditional semiconductor materials. The neural chip is only borrowing the most basic unit of brain information processing. The most basic computer system, such as storage and computational fusion, pulse discharge mechanism, the connection mechanism between neurons, etc., and the mechanism between different scale information processing units has not been integrated into the study of brain-inspired computing architecture. Now an important international trend is to develop neural computing components such as brain memristors, memory containers, and sensory sensors based on new materials such as nanometers, thus supporting the construction of more complex brain-inspired computing architectures. The development of brain-inspired computers and large-scale brain computing systems based on brain-inspired chip development also requires a corresponding software environment to support its wide application.

== See also ==
- Applications of artificial intelligence
- Behavior based robotics
- Bioinformatics
- Bionics
- Cognitive architecture
- Cognitive modeling
- Cognitive science
- Connectionism
- Digital morphogenesis
- Digital organism
- Fuzzy logic
- Gene expression programming
- Genetic algorithm
- Genetic programming
- Gerald Edelman
- Janine Benyus
- Learning classifier system
- Mark A. O'Neill
- Mathematical biology
- Mathematical model
- Natural computation
- Neuroevolution
- Olaf Sporns
- Organic computing
- Unconventional computing

Lists

- List of emerging technologies
- Outline of artificial intelligence
