= IEEE Transactions on Fuzzy Systems =

- Discipline: Fuzzy control systems
- Language: English
- Edited by: Jon Garibaldi

Publication details
- History: 1993-present
- Publisher: IEEE Computational Intelligence Society
- Frequency: Bimonthly
- Impact factor: 12.029 (2020)

Standard abbreviations
- ISO 4: IEEE Trans. Fuzzy Syst.

Indexing
- CODEN: IEFSEV
- ISSN: 1063-6706
- LCCN: 93640611
- OCLC no.: 26109022

Links
- Journal homepage; Online archive

IEEE Transactions on Fuzzy Systems is a bimonthly peer-reviewed scientific journal published by the IEEE Computational Intelligence Society. It covers the theory, design or applications of fuzzy systems ranging from hardware to software, including significant technical achievements, exploratory developments, or performance studies of fielded systems based on fuzzy models. According to the Journal Citation Reports, the journal has a 2021 impact factor of 12.253.

The current editor-in-chief is Dongrui Wu (Huazhong University of Science and Technology), appointed January 1, 2023. Previous editors-in-chief have been:

- Jon Garibaldi (University of Nottingham), 2017–2022.
- Chin-Teng Lin (National Chiao Tung University), 2011–2016.
- Nikhil Ranjan Pal, 2005–2010.
- Jim Keller, 1999–2004.
- Jim Bezdek (founding editor-in-chief), 1993–1998.
