= Clonal selection =

Model of the immune system response to infection

Clonal selection theory of lymphocytes: 1) A hematopoietic stem cell undergoes differentiation and genetic rearrangement to produce 2) immature lymphocytes with many different antigen receptors. Those that bind to 3) antigens from the body's own tissues are destroyed, while the rest mature into 4) inactive lymphocytes. Most of these never encounter a matching 5) foreign antigen, but those that do are activated and produce 6) many clones of themselves.

Clonal selection theory explains the functions of cells of the immune system (lymphocytes) in response to specific antigens invading the body. The concept was introduced by Frank Macfarlane Burnet in 1957 in an attempt to explain the great diversity of antibodies formed during initiation of the immune response. The theory has become the widely accepted model for how the human immune system responds to infection and how certain types of B and T lymphocytes are selected for destruction of specific antigens.

The theory states that in a pre-existing group of lymphocytes (both B and T cells), a specific antigen activates (i.e. selects) only its counter-specific cell, which then induces that particular cell to multiply, producing identical clones for antibody production. This activation occurs in secondary lymphoid organs such as the spleen and the lymph nodes. In short, the theory is an explanation of the mechanism for the generation of diversity of antibody specificity. The first experimental evidence came in 1958, when Gustav Nossal and Joshua Lederberg showed that one B cell always produces only one antibody. The idea turned out to be the foundation of molecular immunology, especially in adaptive immunity.

== Postulates ==
The clonal selection theory can be summarised with the following four tenets:

- Each lymphocyte bears a single type of receptor with a unique specificity (generated by V(D)J recombination).
- Receptor occupation is required for cell activation.
- The differentiated effector cells derived from an activated lymphocyte bear receptors of identical specificity as the parent cell.
- Those lymphocytes bearing receptors for self molecules (i.e., endogenous antigens produced within the body) are destroyed at an early stage.

== Early work ==
In 1900, Paul Ehrlich proposed the so-called "side chain theory" of antibody production. According to it, certain cells exhibit on their surface different "side chains" (i.e. membrane-bound antibodies) able to react with different antigens. When an antigen is present, it binds to a matching side chain. Then the cell stops producing all other side chains and starts intensive synthesis and secretion of the antigen-binding side chain as a soluble antibody. Though distinct from clonal selection, Ehrlich's idea was a selection theory far more accurate than the instructive theories that dominated immunology in the next decades.

In 1955, Niels Jerne put forward a hypothesis that there is already a vast array of soluble antibodies in the serum prior to any infection. The entrance of an antigen into the body results in the selection of only one type of antibody to match it. This supposedly occurred by certain cells phagocytosing the immune complexes and somehow replicating the antibody structure to produce more of it.

In 1957, David W. Talmage hypothesized that antigens bind to antibodies on the surface of antibody-producing cells and "only those cells are selected for multiplication whose synthesized product has affinity for the antigen". The key difference from Ehrlich's theory was that every cell was presumed to synthesize only one sort of antibody. After antigen binding the cell proliferates, forming clones with identical antibodies.

=== Burnet's clonal selection theory ===
Later in 1957, Frank Macfarlane Burnet published a paper titled "A modification of Jerne's theory of antibody production using the concept of clonal selection" in the rather obscure Australian Journal of Science. In it Burnet expanded the ideas of Talmage and named the resulting theory the "clonal selection theory". He further formalised the theory in his 1959 book The Clonal Selection Theory of Acquired Immunity. He explained immunological memory as the cloning of two types of lymphocyte. One clone acts immediately to combat infection whilst the other is longer lasting, remaining in the immune system for a long time and causing immunity to that antigen. According to Burnet's hypothesis, among antibodies are molecules that can probably correspond with varying degrees of precision to all, or virtually all, the antigenic determinants that occur in biological material other than those characteristic of the body itself. Each type of pattern is a specific product of a clone of lymphocytes and it is the essence of the hypothesis that each cell automatically has available on its surface representative reactive sites equivalent to those of the globulin they produce. When an antigen enters the blood or tissue fluids it is assumed that it will attach to the surface of any lymphocyte carrying reactive sites that correspond to one of its antigenic determinants. Then the cell is activated and undergoes proliferation to produce a variety of descendants. In this way, preferential proliferation is initiated of all those clones whose reactive sites correspond to the antigenic determinants on the antigens present in the body. The descendants are capable of active liberation of soluble antibody and lymphocytes, the same functions as the parental forms.

In 1958, Gustav Nossal and Joshua Lederberg showed that one B cell always produces only one antibody, which was the first direct evidence supporting the clonal selection theory.

== Theories supported by clonal selection ==
Burnet and Peter Medawar worked together on understanding immunological tolerance, a phenomenon also explained by clonal selection. This is the organism's ability to tolerate the introduction of cells prior to the development of an immune response as long as it occurs early in the organism's development. There are a vast number of lymphocytes occurring in the immune system, ranging from cells that tolerate self tissue to cells that do not. However, only cells tolerant of self tissue survive the embryonic stage.If non-self tissue is introduced, lymphocytes that develop are the ones that include the non-self tissues as self tissue.

In 1959, Burnet proposed that under certain circumstances, tissues could be successfully transplanted into foreign recipients. This work has led to a much greater understanding of the immune system and also great advances in tissue transplantation. Burnet and Medawar shared the Nobel Prize in Physiology or Medicine in 1960.

In 1974, Niels Kaj Jerne proposed that the immune system functions as a network that is regulated via interactions between the variable parts of lymphocytes and their secreted molecules. Immune network theory is firmly based on the concept of clonal selection. Jerne won the Nobel Prize in Physiology or Medicine in 1984, largely for his contributions to immune network theory.

== See also ==
- Adaptive immune system
- Clonal selection algorithm
- Universal Darwinism
