= Tim van Gelder =

Australian scientist

Tim van Gelder is an Australian researcher who is the co-founder of Austhink Software, an Australian software development company, and the Managing Director of Austhink Consulting.

== Biography ==
He was born in Australia, and was educated at the University of Melbourne (BA, 1984). He went on to receive his PhD from the University of Pittsburgh (1989). He has held academic positions at Indiana University and the Australian National University before returning to Melbourne as an Australian Research Council QEII Research Fellow. In 1998, he transitioned to part-time academic work allowing him to pursue private training and consulting, and in 2005 began working full-time at Austhink Software. In 2009 he transitioned to Managing Director of Austhink Consulting. He co-leads The SWARM Project at the University of Melbourne.

In 2012, he created the non-profit debate website YourView.

== Research ==
Van Gelder's research has had three main phases, corresponding to his PhD research on distributed representation, his subsequent research on dynamic cognition, and his current phase, research into reasoning skills.

=== Distributed representation ===
In his PhD thesis, completed under the supervision of John Haugeland and entitled "Distributed Representation" (1989) van Gelder gave the first sustained exploration of the general concept of distributed representation, and argued that it was a third fundamental kind of representation alongside language and imagery.

=== Dynamics and cognition ===
Van Gelder is a proponent of dynamicism or dynamic cognition in cognitive science. This is a theory of cognition that proposes that dynamical systems theory provides a better model (or metaphor) for human cognition than the 'computational' model. For example, that a Watt governor is a better metaphorical description of the way humans think than a Turing machine style computer.

In his first regular academic position at Indiana University, van Gelder was heavily influenced by researchers such as Robert Port, James Townsend, Esther Thelen and Linda B. Smith who were exploring cognition from a dynamical perspective, i.e., applying the tools of dynamical systems to studying cognitive processes. Van Gelder published a series of articles providing a philosophical commentary on the dynamical approach, culminating in his 1998 paper in Behavioral and Brain Sciences, where he articulated the dynamical approach to cognition and argued that it should be taken seriously as a broad empirical hypothesis comparable to the dominant hypothesis that cognition is digital computation. In his most well-known paper, 'What Might Cognition Be If Not Computation,' van Gelder used the Watt Governor as a model to contrast with the Turing Machine. Van Gelder came to be known as one of the foremost proponents of the dynamical approach, and even as an advocate of anti-representationalism, though he explicitly disavowed that extreme position.

=== Informal reasoning skills ===
Since around 1998, van Gelder's research has been almost exclusively devoted to informal reasoning and critical thinking. In particular, he has been developing and evaluating an approach to improving these skills, known variously as The Reason Method, and LAMP ("Lots of Argument Mapping Practice"). The core idea in van Gelder's approach is that informal reasoning is a skill, and so should improve in the same way as any other skill. According to the leading theory of high-level skill acquisition, the critical ingredient is extensive "deliberate practice" (Ericsson). Van Gelder and his colleagues have shown that extensive deliberate practice can substantially enhance informal reasoning skills.

The main practical challenge in the LAMP approach was finding a way to enable students to engage in extensive deliberate practice of reasoning skills. To confront this, van Gelder and his colleague Andy Bulka developed the argument mapping software packages Reason!Able (2000) and Rationale (2006).

Van Gelder uses this software to help 'teach' the first year philosophy subject Critical Thinking: The Art of Reasoning which reliably achieves substantial gains in the critical thinking abilities of students (0.7 to 0.85 standard deviations) as measured by pre and post semester testing with the use of control groups of the same ages as the student cohort both studying at Melbourne University and not studying at university.

Van Gelder has also applied argument mapping to business decision making, and has released the Reasoning PowerPoint App for this purpose.

== Critics ==
Chris Eliasmith wrote a critique of Tim van Gelder's dynamicism and his proposal to replace the Turing machine by the Watt governor as a model of cognition. Eliasmith argued that the Turing machine concept is more encompassing and better suited as a guiding metaphor than the Watt governor, because the latter is a concrete machine and the former is a mathematical abstraction representing of a whole class of machines.
