= Computational intelligence =

Computer system simulating intelligence

In computer science, computational intelligence (CI) refers to concepts, paradigms, algorithms and implementations of systems that are designed to show "intelligent" behavior in complex and changing environments. These systems are aimed at mastering complex tasks in a wide variety of technical or commercial areas and offer solutions that recognize and interpret patterns, control processes, support decision-making or autonomously manoeuvre vehicles or robots in unknown environments, among other things. These concepts and paradigms are characterized by the ability to learn or adapt to new situations, to generalize, to abstract, to discover and associate. Nature-analog or nature-inspired methods play a key role in this.

CI approaches primarily address those complex real-world problems for which traditional or mathematical modeling is not appropriate for various reasons: the processes cannot be described exactly with complete knowledge, the processes are too complex for mathematical reasoning, they contain some uncertainties during the process, such as unforeseen changes in the environment or in the process itself, or the processes are simply stochastic in nature. Thus, CI techniques are properly aimed at processes that are ill-defined, complex, nonlinear, time-varying and/or stochastic.

A recent definition of the IEEE Computational Intelligence Societey describes CI as the theory, design, application and development of biologically and linguistically motivated computational paradigms. Traditionally the three main pillars of CI have been Neural Networks, Fuzzy Systems and Evolutionary Computation. ... CI is an evolving field and at present in addition to the three main constituents, it encompasses computing paradigms like ambient intelligence, artificial life, cultural learning, artificial endocrine networks, social reasoning, and artificial hormone networks. ... Over the last few years there has been an explosion of research on Deep Learning, in particular deep convolutional neural networks. Nowadays, deep learning has become the core method for artificial intelligence. In fact, some of the most successful AI systems are based on CI. However, as CI is an emerging and developing field there is no final definition of CI, especially in terms of the list of concepts and paradigms that belong to it.

The general requirements for the development of an “intelligent system” are ultimately always the same, namely the simulation of intelligent thinking and action in a specific area of application. To do this, the knowledge about this area must be represented in a model so that it can be processed. The quality of the resulting system depends largely on how well the model was chosen in the development process. Sometimes data-driven methods are suitable for finding a good model and sometimes logic-based knowledge representations deliver better results. Hybrid models are usually used in real applications.

According to actual textbooks, the following methods and paradigms, which largely complement each other, can be regarded as parts of CI:

- Fuzzy systems
- Neural networks and, in particular, convolutional neural networks
- Evolutionary computation and, in particular, multi-objective evolutionary optimization
- Swarm intelligence
- Bayesian networks
- Artificial immune systems
- Learning theory
- Probabilistic methods

== Relationship between hard and soft computing and artificial and computational intelligence ==
Artificial intelligence (AI) is used in the media, but also by some of the scientists involved, as a kind of umbrella term for the various techniques associated with it or with CI. Craenen and Eiben state that attempts to define or at least describe CI can usually be assigned to one or more of the following groups:

- "Relative definition” comparing CI to AI
- Conceptual treatment of key notions and their roles in CI
- Listing of the (established) areas that belong to it

A possible perspective on the relationship between hard computing and artificial intelligence on the one hand, and soft computing and computational intelligence on the other

The relationship between CI and AI has been a frequently discussed topic during the development of CI. While the above list implies that they are synonyms, the vast majority of AI/CI researchers working on the subject consider them to be distinct fields, where either

- CI is an alternative to AI
- AI includes CI
- CI includes AI

The view of the first of the above three points goes back to Zadeh, the founder of the fuzzy set theory, who differentiated machine intelligence into hard and soft computing techniques, which are used in artificial intelligence on the one hand and computational intelligence on the other. In hard computing (HC) and traditional AI (e.g. expert systems), inaccuracy and uncertainty are undesirable characteristics of a system, while soft computing (SC) and thus CI focus on dealing with these characteristics. The adjacent figure illustrates this view and lists the most important CI techniques. Another frequently mentioned distinguishing feature is the representation of information in symbolic form in AI and in sub-symbolic form in CI techniques.

Hard computing is a conventional computing method based on the principles of certainty and accuracy and it is deterministic. It requires a precisely stated analytical model of the task to be processed and a prewritten program, i.e. a fixed set of instructions. The models used are based on Boolean logic (also called crisp logic), where e.g. an element can be either a member of a set or not and there is nothing in between. When applied to real-world tasks, systems based on HC result in specific control actions defined by a mathematical model or algorithm. If an unforeseen situation occurs that is not included in the model or algorithm used, the action will most likely fail.

Soft computing, on the other hand, is based on the fact that the human mind is capable of storing information and processing it in a goal-oriented way, even if it is imprecise and lacks certainty. SC is based on the model of the human brain with probabilistic thinking, fuzzy logic and multi-valued logic. Soft computing can process a wealth of data and perform a large number of computations, which may not be exact, in parallel. For hard problems for which no satisfying exact solutions based on HC are available, SC methods can be applied successfully. SC methods are usually stochastic in nature i.e., they are a randomly defined processes that can be analyzed statistically but not with precision. Up to now, the results of some CI methods, such as deep learning, cannot be verified and it is also not clear what they are based on. This problem represents an important scientific issue for the future.

AI and CI are catchy terms, but they are also so similar that they can be confused. The meaning of both terms has developed and changed over a long period of time, with AI being used first. Bezdek describes this impressively and concludes that such buzzwords are frequently used and hyped by the scientific community, science management and (science) journalism. Not least because AI and biological intelligence are emotionally charged terms and it is still difficult to find a generally accepted definition for the basic term intelligence.

== History ==
In 1950, Alan Turing, one of the founding fathers of computer science, developed a test for computer intelligence known as the Turing test. In this test, a person can ask questions via a keyboard and a monitor without knowing whether his counterpart is a human or a computer. A computer is considered intelligent if the interrogator cannot distinguish the computer from a human. This illustrates the discussion about intelligent computers at the beginning of the computer age.

The term Computational Intelligence was first used as the title of the journal of the same name in 1985 and later by the IEEE Neural Networks Council (NNC), which was founded 1989 by a group of researchers interested in the development of biological and artificial neural networks. On November 21, 2001, the NNC became the IEEE Neural Networks Society, to become the IEEE Computational Intelligence Society two years later by including new areas of interest such as fuzzy systems and evolutionary computation.

The NNC helped organize the first IEEE World Congress on Computational Intelligence in Orlando, Florida in 1994. On this conference the first clear definition of Computational Intelligence was introduced by Bezdek: A system is computationally intelligent when it: deals with only numerical (low-level) data, has pattern-recognition components, does not use knowledge in the AI sense; and additionally when it (begins to) exhibit (1) computational adaptivity; (2) computational fault tolerance; (3) speed approaching human-like turnaround and (4) error rates that approximate human performance.

Today, CI has been enhanced through machine learning and deep learning, utilizing a range of supervised, unsupervised, and reinforcement learning approaches.

== The main algorithmic approaches of CI and their applications ==
The main applications of Computational Intelligence include computer science, engineering, data analysis and bio-medicine.

=== Fuzzy logic ===
Unlike conventional Boolean logic, fuzzy logic is based on fuzzy sets. In both models, a property of an object is defined as belonging to a set; in fuzzy logic, however, the membership is not sharply defined by a yes/no distinction, but is graded gradually. This is done using membership functions that assign a real number between 0 and 1 to each element as the degree of membership. The new set operations introduced in this way define the operations of an associated logic calculus that allows the modeling of inference processes, i.e. logical reasoning. Therefore, fuzzy logic is well suited for engineering decisions without clear certainties and uncertainties or with imprecise data - as with natural language-processing technologies but it doesn't have learning abilities.

This technique tends to apply to a wide range of domains such as control engineering, image processing, fuzzy data clustering and decision making. Fuzzy logic-based control systems can be found, for example, in the field of household appliances in washing machines, dish washers, microwave ovens, etc. or in the area of motor vehicles in gear transmission and braking systems. This principle can also be encountered when using a video camera, as it helps to stabilize the image when the camera is held unsteadily. Other areas such as medical diagnostics, satellite controllers and business strategy selection are just a few more examples of today's application of fuzzy logic.

=== Neural networks ===
An important field of CI is the development of artificial neural networks (ANN) based on the biological ones, which can be defined by three main components: the cell-body which processes the information, the axon, which is a device enabling the signal conducting, and the synapse, which controls signals. Therefore, ANNs are very well suited for distributed information processing systems, enabling the process and the learning from experiential data. ANNs aim to mimic cognitive processes of the human brain. The main advantages of this technology therefore include fault tolerance, pattern recognition even with noisy images and the ability to learn.

Concerning its applications, neural networks can be classified into five groups: data analysis and classification, associative memory, data clustering or compression, generation of patterns, and control systems. The numerous applications include, for example, the analysis and classification of medical data, including the creation of diagnoses, speech recognition, data mining, image processing, forecasting, robot control, credit approval, pattern recognition, face and fraud detection and dealing with nonlinearities of a system in order to control it. ANNs have the latter area of application and data clustering in common with fuzzy logic. Generative systems based on deep learning and convolutional neural networks, such as chatGPT or DeepL, are a relatively new field of application.

=== Evolutionary computation ===
Evolutionary computation can be seen as a family of methods and algorithms for global optimization, which are usually based on a population of candidate solutions. They are inspired by biological evolution and are often summarized as evolutionary algorithms. These include the genetic algorithms, evolution strategy, genetic programming and many others. They are considered as problem solvers for tasks not solvable by traditional mathematical methods and are frequently used for optimization including multi-objective optimization. Since they work with a population of candidate solutions that are processed in parallel during an iteration, they can easily be distributed to different computer nodes of a cluster. As often more than one offspring is generated per pairing, the evaluations of these offspring, which are usually the most time-consuming part of the optimization process, can also be performed in parallel.

In the course of optimization, the population learns about the structure of the search space and stores this information in the chromosomes of the solution candidates. After a run, this knowledge can be reused for similar tasks by adapting some of the “old” chromosomes and using them to seed a new population.

=== Swarm intelligence ===
Swarm intelligence is based on the collective behavior of decentralized, self-organizing systems, typically consisting of a population of simple agents that interact locally with each other and with their environment. Despite the absence of a centralized control structure that dictates how the individual agents should behave, local interactions between such agents often lead to the emergence of global behavior. Among the recognized representatives of algorithms based on swarm intelligence are particle swarm optimization and ant colony optimization. Both are metaheuristic optimization algorithms that can be used to (approximately) solve difficult numerical or complex combinatorial optimization tasks. Since both methods, like the evolutionary algorithms, are based on a population and also on local interaction, they can be easily parallelized and show comparable learning properties.

=== Bayesian networks ===
In complex application domains, Bayesian networks provide a means to efficiently store and evaluate uncertain knowledge. A Bayesian network is a probabilistic graphical model that represents a set of random variables and their conditional dependencies by a directed acyclic graph. The probabilistic representation makes it easy to draw conclusions based on new information. In addition, Bayesian networks are well suited for learning from data. Their wide range of applications includes medical diagnostics, risk management, information retrieval, text analysis, e.g. for spam filters, credit rating of companies, and the operation of complex industrial processes.

=== Artificial immune systems ===
Artificial immune systems are another group of population-based metaheuristic learning algorithms designed to solve clustering and optimization problems. These algorithms are inspired by the principles of theoretical immunology and the processes of the vertebrate immune system, and use the learning and memory properties of the immune system to solve a problem. Operators similar to those known from evolutionary algorithms are used to clone and mutate artificial lymphocytes. Artificial immune systems offer interesting capabilities such as adaptability, self-learning, and robustness that can be used for various tasks in data processing, manufacturing systems, system modeling and control, fault detection, or cybersecurity.

=== Learning theory ===
Still looking for a way of "reasoning" close to the humans' one, learning theory is one of the main approaches of CI. In psychology, learning is the process of bringing together cognitive, emotional and environmental effects and experiences to acquire, enhance or change knowledge, skills, values and world views. Learning theories then helps understanding how these effects and experiences are processed, and then helps making predictions based on previous experience.

=== Probabilistic methods ===
Being one of the main elements of fuzzy logic, probabilistic methods firstly introduced by Paul Erdos and Joel Spencer in 1974, aim to evaluate the outcomes of a Computation Intelligent system, mostly defined by randomness. Therefore, probabilistic methods bring out the possible solutions to a problem, based on prior knowledge.

== Impact on university education ==
Over the last decade, there has been a strong increase in academic teaching for CI or its subfields. In 2025, the website EduRank.org listed 5,925 universities worldwide offering courses in artificial intelligence. These are spread across the regions of Asia (2,536), Europe (1,368), North America (1,295), Latin America (370), Africa (305), and Oceania (51).

Some of the authors cited in this article teach at the following universities: Otto von Guericke University, Magdeburg, Germany, Stellenbosch University, South Africa, Ulster University, UK, Vrije Universiteit Amsterdam, NL, Nicolaus Copernicus University Toruń, PL, University of Applied Sciences and Arts, Switzerland, University of Warwick, UK, Michigan State University, USA, Université Libre de Bruxelles, Belgium, University of Essex, UK, and Loughborough University, UK.

== Publications ==
Recognized journals include Computational Intelligence, International Journal of Computational Intelligence Systems, Applied Computational Intelligence and Soft Computing, and IEEE Computational Intelligence Magazine. In addition, there are IEEE publications on a number of CI fields:

- IEEE Transactions on Neural Networks and Learning Systems
- IEEE Transactions on Fuzzy Systems
- IEEE Transactions on Evolutionary Computation
- IEEE Transactions on Emerging Topics in Computational Intelligence
- IEEE Transactions on Autonomous Mental Development
- IEEE Transactions on Computational Biology and Bioinformatics
- IEEE Transactions on Computational Intelligence and AI in Games

== See also ==
- AI effect
- Artificial intelligence
- Cognitive robotics
- Computational finance and Computational economics
- Concept mining
- Developmental robotics
- Data mining
- Evolutionary robotics
- ELIZA effect
- Knowledge-based engineering
- Natural computing
- Synthetic intelligence
- International Meeting on Computational Intelligence Methods for Bioinformatics and Biostatistics
