= Computational immunology =

Bioinformatics approaches to immunology

Computational immunology of immunoinformatics is a field within immunology and bioinformatics that applies computational methods to analyze immune-related data and model immune system processes. Because the immune system consists of highly interconnected cells, molecules, and signaling networks, many of its mechanisms are complex and difficult to study using experimental approaches alone. Computational immunology aims to represent these immunological processes as computational problems that can be examined using algorithms, statistical models, and data-driven techniques.

== Introduction ==
The immune system, which protects the body against infections, harmful pathogens, and other foreign substances, is a complex biological system, and its study is considered one of the more challenging areas in biology and medicine. Immunology research seeks to understand the mechanisms underlying immune responses and to support the development of vaccines and therapies for a wide range of diseases. However, many aspects of the immune system remain difficult to investigate, as interactions between immune cells, molecules, and signaling pathways are highly dynamic and not yet fully understood.

At the same time, advances in high-throughput experimental and 'omics' technologies have led to a substantial increase in the volume and complexity of immunological data. For example, sequencing of human and model organism genomes has generated large datasets relevant to immunology, while functional and clinical data have been extensively reported in the scientific literature and recorded in clinical settings. To address these challenges and opportunities, computational approaches have been used to organize and analyze these large-scale datasets, contributing to the emergence of computational immunology. The outputs of these analyses can provide new insights into immune system function, disease mechanisms, and the development of vaccines and therapies.

== History ==
Earlier contributions to Computational Immunology can be traced back to the late 19th century, when Pyotr Dimitrievich En'ko introduced a probabilistic framework to describe the spread of infectious diseases, including measles, representing one of the first stochastic approaches to epidemic modeling. Later, in the early twentieth century, the field advanced through early applications of mathematical modeling to infectious diseases such as malaria, with a focus on understanding patterns of disease transmission.

During the twentieth century, the use of mathematics, statistics, and computational methods in studies of the immune system and disease processes increased progressively. These developments contributed to the emergence of computational immunology as an interdisciplinary field applying computational approaches to immunological questions.

== Immunological database ==
The rapid growth in the volume and complexity of immunological data has led to the development of specialized databases for data storage, organization, and analysis. These data are highly diverse and are typically organized into databases designed to support different areas of research.

A wide range of immunological databases have been developed to store and curate such data, supporting the growth of Computational Immunology by enabling the analysis and use of these resources to generate new knowledge. The table below provides selected examples of widely used and well-established immunological databases.

Database	Description	References
IEDB	Database of experimentally validated epitopes and MHC binding data.	
Violin	a web-based vaccine database and analysis system	
IMGT	Integrated resource for immunogenetics data, including immunoglobulins, T cell receptors, and MHC.	
Ebi-ipd	Integrated resource for immune gene polymorphism databases, including HLA, KIR, and MHC	
Allergen	Database of standardized allergen nomenclature for IgE-associated allergenic proteins	
ImmPort	Comprehensive database and analysis portal for immunological research.	
SAAINT-DB	Comprehensive structural antibody database for antibody modeling, design, and antibody–antigen interaction analysis.	
The Cancer Immunome Atlas	Comprehensive database of cancer immunogenomic data.	

== Tools ==
In computational immunology, a wide range of tools has been developed to support the analysis, modeling, and interpretation of immunological data. These tools, often used in combination with specialized databases, enable the study of complex immune system processes and facilitate advanced simulations of immune responses. Representative examples of such tools are listed in the table below.

Tool	Description	References
IEDB tools	Epitope prediction and analysis tools for B- and T-cell epitopes	
IMGT/V-QUEST	Tool for analysis of immunoglobulin and T cell receptor sequences	
DTU Immunoinformatics Tools	Collection of web-based tools for prediction and analysis of immunological features, including epitopes, MHC binding, and immune interactions.	
IgBLAST	Tool for analysis of immunoglobulin and T cell receptor sequences, including V(D)J gene assignment and alignment.	
Abysis	Database and analysis tool for antibody sequences and structures, including annotation of immunoglobulin regions.	
scRepertoire	A toolkit for single-cell immune profiling	

== Applications ==
=== Allergies ===
Allergies represent an important area of immunology, with significant variability in immune responses among individuals, including those with similar genetic backgrounds. The assessment of protein allergenicity typically involves three main aspects: immunogenicity, cross-reactivity, and clinical manifestations. Immunogenicity is primarily associated with the activation of immunoglobulin E (IgE)-producing B cells and T cells in response to specific allergens. Consequently, many studies focus on identifying B-cell and T-cell epitopes, as well as the structural features of allergens that influence their allergenic potential.

Computational immunology approaches have been increasingly applied to predict protein allergenicity and to support the evaluation of novel proteins, particularly in food and biotechnology applications. These methods integrate immunological databases with predictive tools to identify potential allergens and assess cross-reactivity.

=== Computational Modeling of the Immune System ===
Computational modeling has played a significant role in improving our understanding of diseases and the dynamics of immune responses. Given the complexity of the immune system, mathematical frameworks, algorithms, and computational techniques can be used to represent it in simplified, interpretable models that facilitate deeper analysis and prediction.

For example, mathematical models have been used to study within-host dynamics and immune selection in malaria, providing insights into how pathogens evade immune responses and establish persistent infections.

Another important application of computational modeling in immunoinformatics is the analysis of antigen processing and presentation pathways. In this process, pathogen-derived proteins are degraded into smaller peptide fragments, known as epitopes, which are then transported into the endoplasmic reticulum by proteins such as TAP. Within this compartment, peptides bind to MHC molecules and are subsequently presented on the cell surface for recognition by T cells. This multistep biological pathway can be represented using computational models that incorporate key processes such as proteasomal cleavage, peptide transport efficiency, and MHC binding affinity. By simulating these steps, such models enable the prediction of which peptides are more likely to be presented to the immune system. These approaches have become essential tools in immunological research and are widely applied in epitope prediction, immunogenicity assessment, and rational vaccine design.

=== Epitope Mapping ===
Epitopes are immune-recognized regions that correspond to specific parts of an antigen identified by the immune system. The identification of these regions plays an important role in vaccine design and antibody development. With the advancement of computational methods, the identification and analysis of epitopes have become more efficient and widely accessible.

In this context, the National Institute of Allergy and Infectious Diseases has supported epitope-related research through funding the development and continued expansion of the Immune Epitope Database (IEDB), a publicly available resource of experimentally validated epitopes, which integrates large-scale experimental data and supports research in vaccine and therapeutic development.

=== Vaccine Design ===
Computational immunology has significantly facilitated the vaccine design process by reducing both the time and cost associated with vaccine development. Immunoinformatics, which integrates immunology with computational sciences, enables the identification of key antigenic components, as well as the design, evaluation, and optimization of vaccine candidates.

In recent years, numerous studies have applied immunoinformatics approaches to vaccine design against a wide range of pathogens, including Leptospira (leptospirosis), Brucella, human rhinovirus C, human metapneumovirus, African swine fever virus, Helicobacter pylori, SARS-CoV-2, and Leishmania species associated with visceral leishmaniasis. These examples are illustrative, and a large number of studies have been conducted across diverse infectious diseases.

== See also ==
- Bioinformatics
- Immunology
