= Flaming Arrow =

Flaming Arrow or variation may refer to:

== Weaponry ==
- Fire arrow, a rocket propelled arrow
- Flaming arrow, a burning arrow used to cause fires
- Rocket (firework), also called "flaming arrow"

== Military ==
- No. 27 Squadron IAF "Flaming Arrows" Indian Air Force squadron
- INAS 336 "Flaming Arrows" Indian Naval Air Squadron

== Places ==
- Flaming Arrow Rock (mountain; 45°42′30″N 110°58′03″W), see List of mountains in Gallatin County, Montana
- Flaming Arrow Scout Reservation, Lake Wales, Florida, USA; run by the Gulf Ridge Council of the Boy Scouts of America
- Flaming Arrow District, Sam Houston Council Area, Texas, USA; a regional division of Scouting in Texas

=== Structures ===
- Flaming Arrow Lodge, Bozeman, Montana, USA; an NRHP registered building, see National Register of Historic Places listings in Gallatin County, Montana
- Flaming Arrow Ranch House, Bozeman, Montana, USA; a NRHP registered building, see National Register of Historic Places listings in Gallatin County, Montana

== Entertainment ==
=== Stage, television and film ===
- The Flaming Arrow, a film by Joris Ivens, 1912
- "Flaming Arrows", an episode in The Adventures of Tarzan movie serials, 1921
- "The Flaming Arrow", an episode in the White Eagle movie serials, 1922
- "Flaming Arrows", an episode in The Lightning Warrior movie serials, 1931
- "Flaming Arrows", an episode in The Last of the Mohicans movie serials, 1932
- "The Flaming Arrow", an episode in the television series Zorro, 1958

=== Literature ===
- The Flaming Arrow, a Star Trek: New Earth novel by Kathy Oltion and Jerry Oltion, 2000
- Flaming Arrow, novel by Cassie Edwards, 1997
- Ignea Sagitta (Latin: Flaming Arrow), a poem by the Carmelites, 1270

=== Music ===
- "Flaming Arrows", a 2017 song by Carmen Justice
- "Flaming Arrow", a 2009 song by Jupiter One

== Sports ==
- Flaming Arrows, the sports team name for Sachem School District, Long Island, New York State, US
- Arellano Flaming Arrows, now Arellano Chiefs, the sports team name for Arellano University, Manila, Philippines

== Other uses ==
- Flaming Arrow, a cultivar of Pitcairnia pseudoundulata

== See also ==
- Fire Arrow (disambiguation)
- Arrow (disambiguation)
- Flaming (disambiguation)
- Flame (disambiguation)
- Fire (disambiguation)
