= Flamboyant (disambiguation) =

Flamboyant is a style of Gothic architecture.

Flamboyant may also refer to:

- Flamboyant, the common English name of Delonix regia, an ornamental tree
- Flamboyant (album), a 2019 album by Dorian Electra and its title track
- "Flamboyant" (Big L song), 2000
- "Flamboyant" (Pet Shop Boys song), 2004
- Flamboyant flower beetle or Eudicella gralli, a type of scarab beetle
- Pfeffer's flamboyant cuttlefish, a species of cuttlefish

== See also ==
- Flame (disambiguation)
- Flaming (disambiguation)
