= Flame (disambiguation) =

Flame is burning gas or vapor, the visible part of fire.

Flame, flames, FLAME or FLAMES may also refer to:

== Fire ==
- Eternal flame, a constantly burning flame
  - Olympic flame, eternal flame used as a symbol for the Olympic Games
- Flame retardant, materials that resist fire
- Premixed flame, a flame in which the oxidizer has been mixed with the fuel before it reaches the flame front
- Flame (color), a medium scarlet hue

== People ==
- D-Flame (born 1971), German musician
- Penny Flame, screen name of Jennifer Ketcham (born 1983), former American adult actress and reality TV star
- La Flame, stage name of American rapper Travis Scott (born 1991)
- Flame (rapper) (born 1981), American Christian hip-hop artist
- Flame, a female member of the TV show American Gladiators
- Flame, a female member of the TV show UK Gladiators

== Fiction ==
- Flames (1917 film), a 1917 British silent drama film
- Flames (1926 film), a 1926 film featuring Boris Karloff
- Flames (1932 film), a 1932 American film
- Flames (1934 film), a 1934 Chinese film
- Flame, German Shepherd dog star in 1946 film, My Dog Shep
- Flames (Philippine TV series), a 1997 Filipino drama anthology series, and its film adaptation
- Flame (1975 film), a 1975 South Korean film
- Flame (1996 film), a 1996 Zimbabwean film
- Slade in Flame, a 1975 film also known as Flame and starring members of the British rock group Slade
- Flames (Indian TV series), an Indian coming-of-age web series
- Flame (Sunwoo novel), a 1957 Korean novel by Swon Wu Hee
- Flame (comics), a comic book character created in the 1930s
- Flame (Marvel Comics), a Marvel Comics character
- A character in the cartoon Spider Riders
- Fall of a Kingdom, a novel by Hilari Bell, previously named Flame
- Flame Princess, a character in the animated series Adventure Time
- Princess Flame, a character in the TV series Blazing Dragons

== Music ==
=== Bands, groups ===
- Flame (band), Japanese hip-hop group
- The Flames, a 1960s South African pop/rock group

=== Albums ===
- Flame (Richard Barbieri and Tim Bowness album), 1994
- Flame (Johnny Duhan album), 1996
- Flame (Patti LaBelle album), 1997
- Flame (Real Life album), 1985
- Flame (Ronnie Laws album), 1978
- Flames (Bini album), 2025

=== Songs ===
- "Flame" (Sebadoh song), 1999
- "Flame" (Claire Sproule song), 2005
- "Flame" (Bell X1 song), 2006
- "Flame" (Sundara Karma song), 2015
- "Flame" (Tinashe song), 2017
- "Flames" (David Guetta and Sia song), 2018
- "Flames" (R3hab, Zayn and Jungleboi song), 2019
- "Flames" (SG Lewis song), 2019
- "Flame" (Laine Hardy song), 2019
- "Flames" (Mod Sun song), 2021
- "Flame", a song by Cravity, 2020
- "Flames", by Red Fang from Only Ghosts, 2016

== Computers and technology ==
- Flame (robot), an experimental walking robot
- Flame (malware), computer malware discovered in May 2012
- Flaming (Internet), a message sent over the internet with the deliberate intent to insult
- Fractal flame, a group of fractals developed in 1992
- A type of visual effects software by Autodesk
- O_{2} Xda or Xda Flame, a smartphone by O2
- FLAME clustering, a data clustering algorithm

== Species names ==
- Flame (moth), a species of noctuid moth
- Flame skimmer, type of dragonfly
- Flame maple, type of maple tree
- Flame robin, type of robin
- Dryas iulia, flame butterfly

== Organizations ==
- Facts and Logic About the Middle East (FLAME), a pro-Israel organization
- Former Local Authority Members Éire, Irish political lobby

=== Sports teams ===
- Liberty Flames, the athletics teams of Liberty University
- Calgary Flames, Canadian ice hockey team
  - Atlanta Flames, original name of the Calgary Flames
- UIC Flames, the athletics teams of University of Illinois at Chicago
- Guildford Flames, English ice hockey team
- Westchester Flames F.C., American football (soccer) team
- Canterbury Flames, New Zealand netball team
- Florida Flame, American basketball team
- Malawi national football team, nicknamed "The Flames"

== Other ==
- Flame Nebula, an emission nebula in Orion's Belt
- Flame polishing, a method of polishing materials using flames or heat
- Flame cell, a type of cell found in invertebrates
- Flame (chimpanzee), an individual chimpanzee
- FLAMES (game), a paper-and-pencil game
- Flame (sculpture), a stainless steel sculpture by Devin Laurence Field
- FLAMES (medicine), a clinical sub entity of myelin oligodendrocyte glycoprotein antibody associated disease

== See also ==
- Flam (disambiguation)
- Flaming (disambiguation)
- Flame tree (disambiguation)
- Big Flame (disambiguation)
- The Flame (disambiguation)
- Flamme (disambiguation)
