= Fire Arrow (disambiguation) =

Fire Arrow or variation, may refer to:

== Weaponry ==
- Fire arrow, a rocket propelled arrow
- Flaming arrow, a burning arrow used to cause fires
- Bo-hiya (Japanese fire arrow), used by samurai
- Rocket (firework), also called "fire arrow"

== Entertainment ==
- Agneyaasthram (1972 poem; Sanskrit: Fire-Arrow) by Chemmanam Chacko
- The Fire Arrow (1989 film; Korean: 불화살) written and directed by Kang Dae-ha
- The Fire Arrow (2006 novel) novel by Richard S. Wheeler

== Other uses ==
- Plymouth Fire Arrow (1970s car), a sedan from Chrysler

== See also ==
- Flaming Arrow (disambiguation)
- Arrow (disambiguation)
- Fire (disambiguation)
