= Flame of the forest =

Flame of the forest is a common name for several plants and may refer to:

- Butea monosperma, native to South and Southeast Asia
- Delonix regia, native to Madagascar
- Mucuna bennettii, native to Papua New Guinea
- Pieris floribunda, native to North America
- Spathodea, native to Africa

== See also ==
- Flame tree (disambiguation)
