= Flame tree =

Flame tree may refer to:

== Common name of trees ==
- Alloxylon flammeum, commonly known as the Queensland tree waratah or red silky oak
- Brachychiton acerifolius, Illawarra flame tree
- Butea monosperma, Flame in the woods
- Delonix regia, Royal poinciana
- Embothrium coccineum, Chilean flame tree, also known as Chilean firebush
- Erythrina abyssinica, flame tree of eastern and southern Africa
- Erythrina spp., Coral trees
- Koelreuteria bipinnata, Chinese flame tree
- Nuytsia floribunda, Australian Christmas tree
- Peltophorum, African flame tree
- Spathodea campanulata, African tulip tree, also known as African flame tree

== Other uses ==
- Flame Tree Publishing, a British publisher
- "Flame Trees" (song), by Cold Chisel
- "Flame-Tree in a Quarry", poem by Judith Wright

== See also ==
- Flame (disambiguation)
- Flame of the forest, a list of similarly named plants
- The Flame Trees of Thika, a 1981 British television serial
