= The Flame =

The Flame may refer to:

== Film ==
- The Flame (1920 film), a British silent romance directed by Floyd Martin Thornton
- The Flame (1923 film), a German silent drama directed by Ernst Lubitsch
- The Flame (1926 film), a French silent drama directed by René Hervi
- The Flame (1936 film), a French drama directed by André Berthomieu
- The Flame (1947 film), an American crime noir film directed by John H. Auer
- The Flame (1952 film), an Italian historical melodrama directed by Alessandro Blasetti

== Music ==
=== Albums ===
- The Flame (Annabel Lamb album) or the title song, 1984
- The Flame (Dover album) or the title song, 2003
- The Flame (Gina Jeffreys album), 1994
- The Flame (The Flames album), 1970
- The Flame (Steve Lacy album) or the title song, 1982

=== Songs ===
- "The Flame" (Arcadia song), 1986
- "The Flame" (Cheap Trick song), 1988
- "The Flame", by Fine Young Cannibals from The Finest, 1996
- "The Flame", by Tina Arena, the Sydney Children's Choir, and the Melbourne Symphony Orchestra at the 2000 Summer Olympics opening ceremony
- "The Flame", by W.A.S.P. from W.A.S.P., 1984
- "The Flame (Is Gone)", by the Dear Hunter from Act V: Hymns with the Devil in Confessional, 2016

== Print media ==
- The Flame, the student newspaper of the University of Santo Tomas Faculty of Arts and Letters
- Flame (comics), a Fox Feature Syndicate superhero
- The Flame (novel), a 1900 novel by Gabriele D'Annunzio
- The Flame (poetry collection), a 2018 poetry collection by Leonard Cohen

== Other uses ==
- The Flame (DHARMA Initiative), a fictional research project station in the TV series Lost
- The Flame (wrestler), Jody Hamilton (1938–2021), American professional wrestler
- The Flame, a fictional AI in the TV series The 100

== See also ==
- Flame (disambiguation)
- Flacăra (disambiguation)
