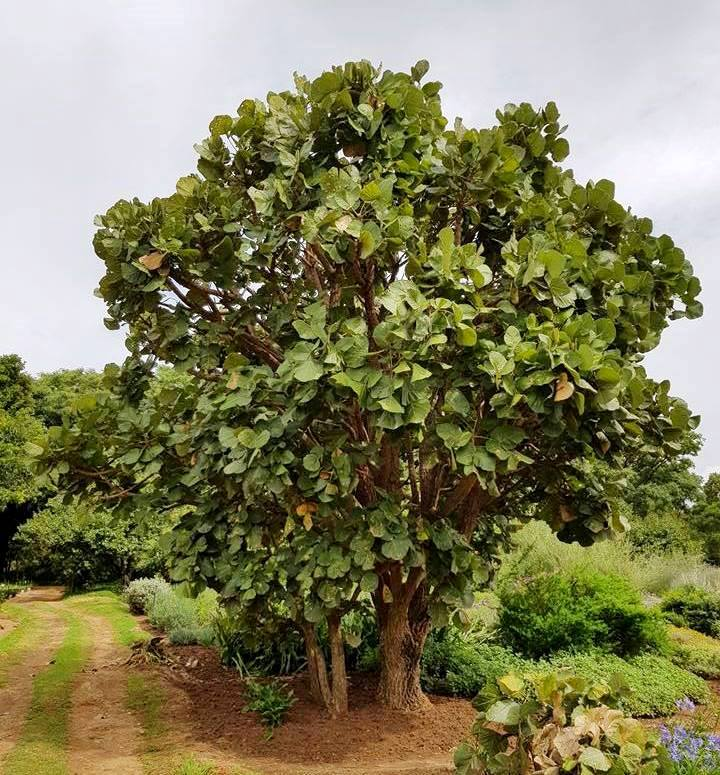

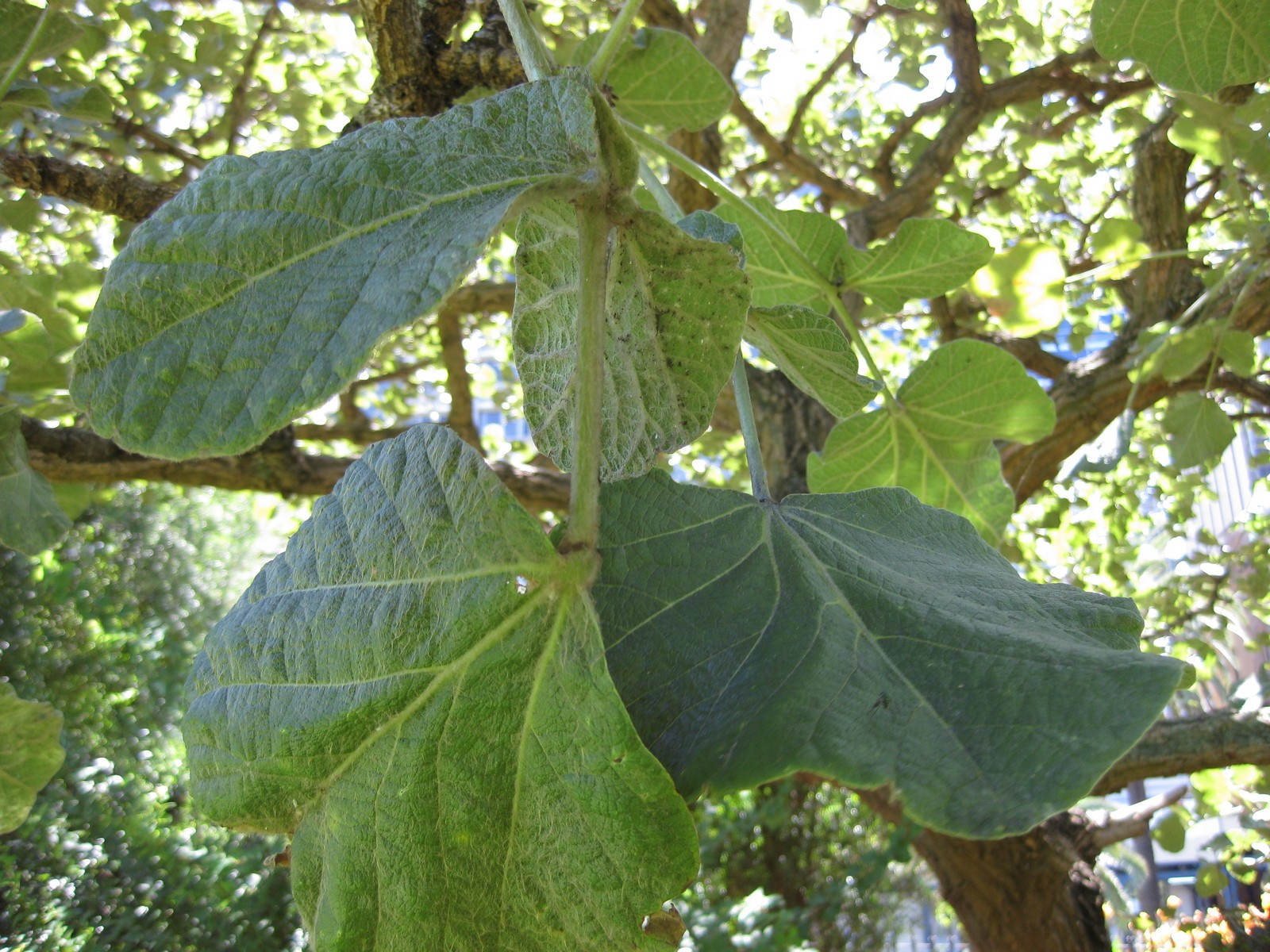
- Habit and the very large, ovate leaflets

Conservation status
- Least Concern (IUCN 3.1)

Scientific classification
- Kingdom: Plantae
- Clade: Embryophytes
- Clade: Tracheophytes
- Clade: Spermatophytes
- Clade: Angiosperms
- Clade: Eudicots
- Clade: Rosids
- Order: Fabales
- Family: Fabaceae
- Subfamily: Faboideae
- Genus: Erythrina
- Species: E. latissima

Binomial name
- Erythrina latissima E.Mey.

Synonyms
- Homotypic Synonyms: Corallodendron latissimum (E.Mey.) Kuntze; Heterotypic Synonyms: Erythrina gibbsiae Baker f.; Erythrina sandersonii Harv.

= Erythrina latissima =

Broad-leaved coral tree

Species of legume

Erythrina latissima is a species of flowering plant in the family Annonaceae. It is sometimes referred to by the common names Lucky Bean Tree, Broad-Leaved Coral Tree, or Cork Tree. It is a deciduous tree from southern Africa growing 5 to 8 m tall. It is a member of the Fabaceae and occurs naturally in the Afrotemperate mist-belt of South Africa and Eswatini to the uplands of Mozambique, Zimbabwe and adjacent Botswana. It is often cultivated as a tree for gardens and parks. In Zimbabwe its range overlaps with the similar Erythrina abyssinica.

== Description ==
It has pubescent branchlets and fissured, corky bark. The foliage is soft and initially woolly in texture, with some prickles and prominently raised venation below. Their scarlet flowers with red, densely velvety calyxes may appear from winter to early summer, usually before new foliage is produced. The fruit is a cylindrical articulated pod, bearing orange to red seeds with a black spot.

== Gallery ==
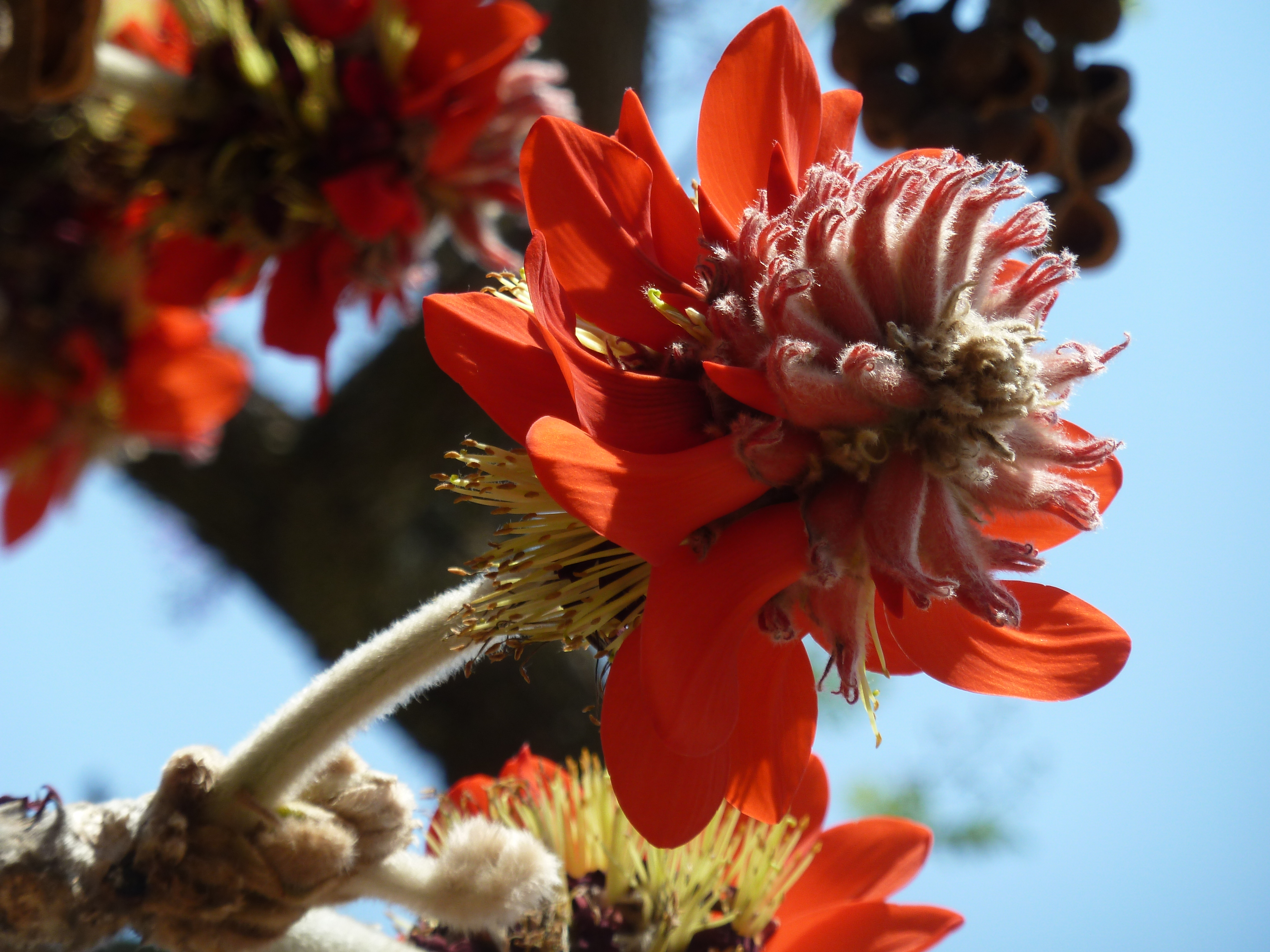
Flowers and velvety red calyxes

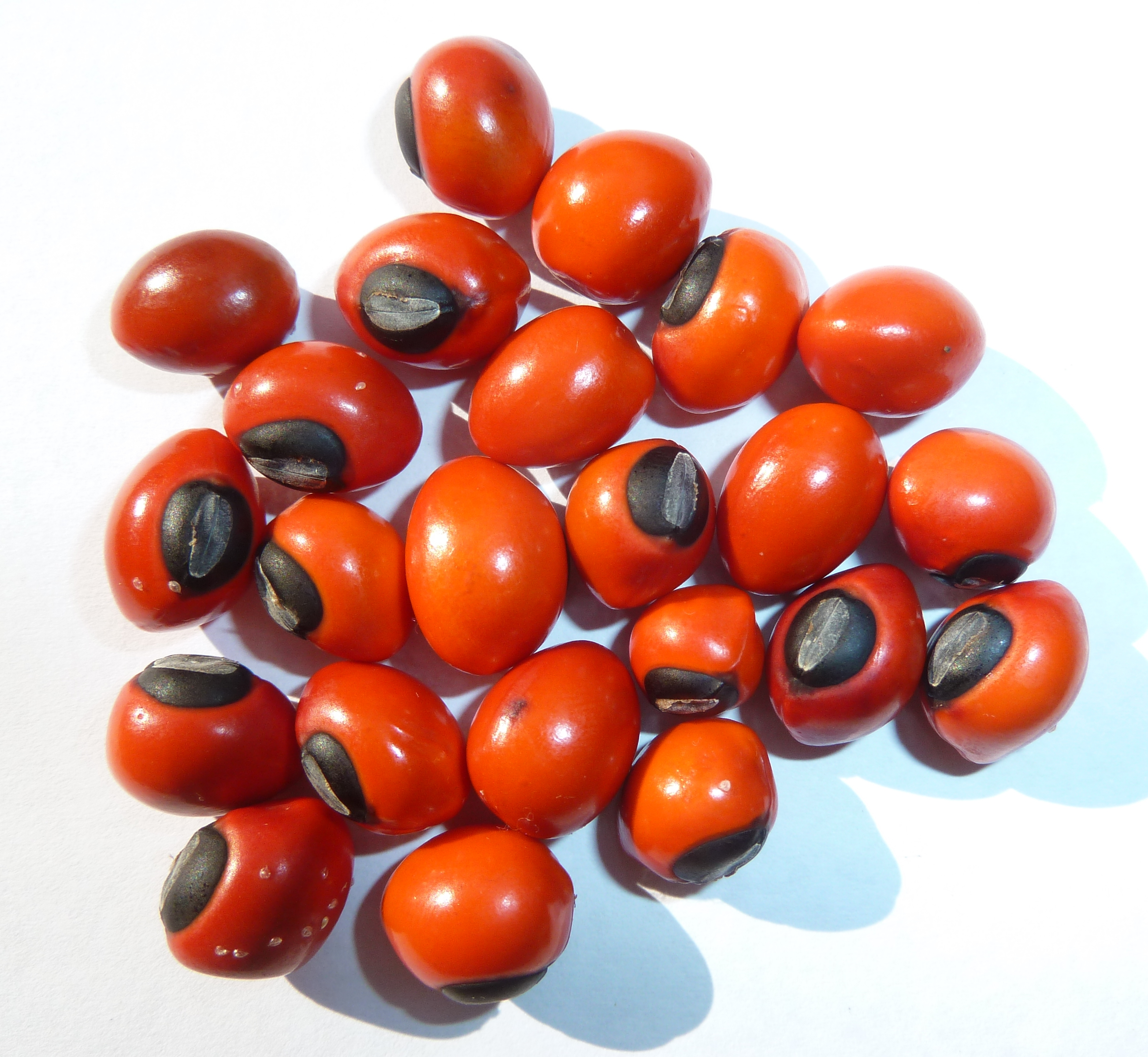
Black and red seeds, fallen from seed pods

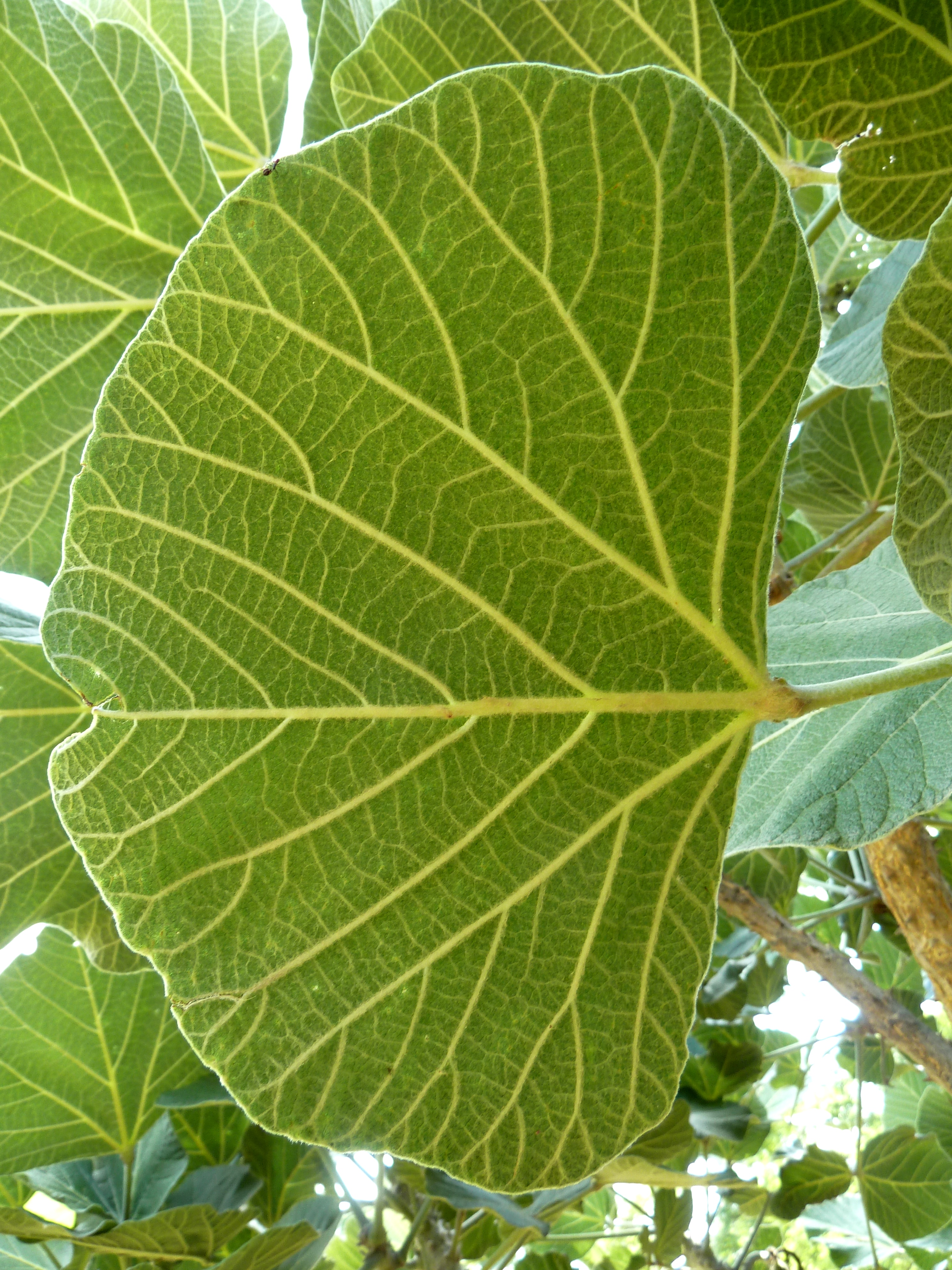
Venation of single leaflet
