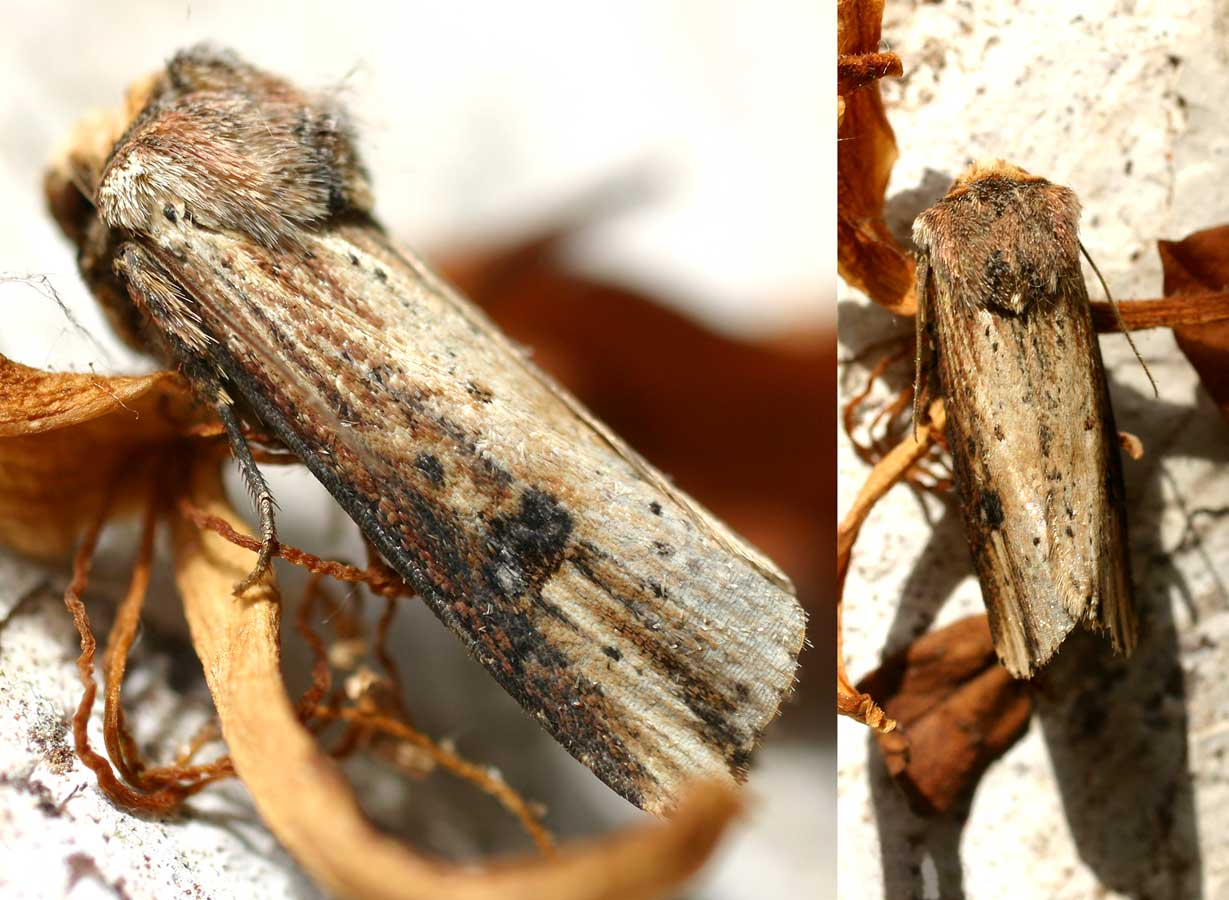

Scientific classification
- Kingdom: Animalia
- Phylum: Arthropoda
- Clade: Pancrustacea
- Class: Insecta
- Order: Lepidoptera
- Superfamily: Noctuoidea
- Family: Noctuidae
- Subfamily: Noctuinae
- Genus: Axylia; Hübner, [1821]

= Axylia =

Genus of moths

Axylia is a genus of moths of the family Noctuidae. The genus was described by Jacob Hübner in 1821.

== Species ==
- Axylia annularis Saalmüller, 1891
- Axylia belophora D. S. Fletcher, 1961
- Axylia bryi Laporte, 1984
- Axylia coniorta (Hampson, 1903)
- Axylia dallolmoi Berio, 1972
- Axylia destefanii Berio, 1944
- Axylia dispilata Swinhoe, 1891
- Axylia edwardsi D. S. Fletcher, 1961
- Axylia extranea (Berio, 1972)
- Axylia gabriellae Laporte, 1975
- Axylia ikondae Berio, 1972
- Axylia infusa Berio, 1972
- Axylia intimima D. S. Fletcher, 1961
- Axylia marthae Laporte, 1984
- Axylia orbicularis Laporte, 1984
- Axylia posterioducta D. S. Fletcher, 1961
- Axylia putris - the flame (Linnaeus, 1761)
- Axylia renalis Moore, 1881
- Axylia rhodopea (Hampson, 1907)
- Axylia sanyetiensis Laporte, 1984
- Axylia sciodes D. S. Fletcher, 1961
- Axylia vespertina Laporte, 1984
