= Singing Sky =

Sculpture in Beaverton, Oregon, U.S.

- The sculpture in 2022
- Artist: Richard Taylor
- Year: 2010
- Type: Sculpture
- Medium: Aluminum, Imron
- Dimensions: 4.6 m (15 ft)
- Location: Beaverton, Oregon, United States; 45°29′01″N 122°48′21″W
- Website: taylorsculpt.com/Main/StandingSculptureAa

Singing Sky is an outdoor 2010 sculpture by Wisconsin artist Richard Taylor, installed at Beaverton City Park in Beaverton, Oregon, United States. It is part of the collection of the Beaverton Arts Commission.

== Description and history ==
Richard Taylor's Singing Sky is an outdoor aluminum and Imron sculpture installed at Beaverton's City Fountain Park. Taylor's design was selected from more than 200 proposals by the Beaverton Art Commission, whose goal was to "[incorporate] significant and accessible works of art that embrace Beaverton's diverse traditions and history". The 15-foot (4.6 m), burnt orange painted piece was installed on July 13, 2010 and a dedication ceremony was held the following day.

Taylor has said of public art in general and his sculpture specifically:

One of my favorite aspects of a public piece is that it sometimes sparks observations between strangers who wouldn't have conversed otherwise. Singing Sky, was created with the theme of diversity as its central message. I like to use abstract shapes as a language to help convey the meaning in my work. This opens a broad number of interpretations to be found by those who look for the message. Visually, I hope that it brings a sense of wonder and whimsy to those driving or walking by the park, and that the spirit of the sculpture creates a sense of being uplifted.

== See also ==
- 2010 in art
- List of public art in Beaverton, Oregon
