= Flame (sculpture) =

Sculpture in Springfield, Oregon, U.S.

- The sculpture in 2025
- Artist: Devin Laurence Field
- Year: 2016
- Medium: Stainless steel sculpture
- Dimensions: 19 m (62 ft)
- Location: Springfield, Oregon, U.S.
- 44.083806°N 123.042072°W

Flame, or Springfield Flame, is an outdoor 62-foot (19 m) stainless steel sculpture of a flame by Devin Laurence Field, installed at the intersection of Gateway Street and Randy Papé Beltline, in Springfield, Oregon, United States. The $236,000 installation was paid for by a hotel tax.

== See also ==
- Barometer (sculpture)
- Three Creeks, One Will
