= Beaverton City Park =

Public park in Beaverton, Oregon, U.S.

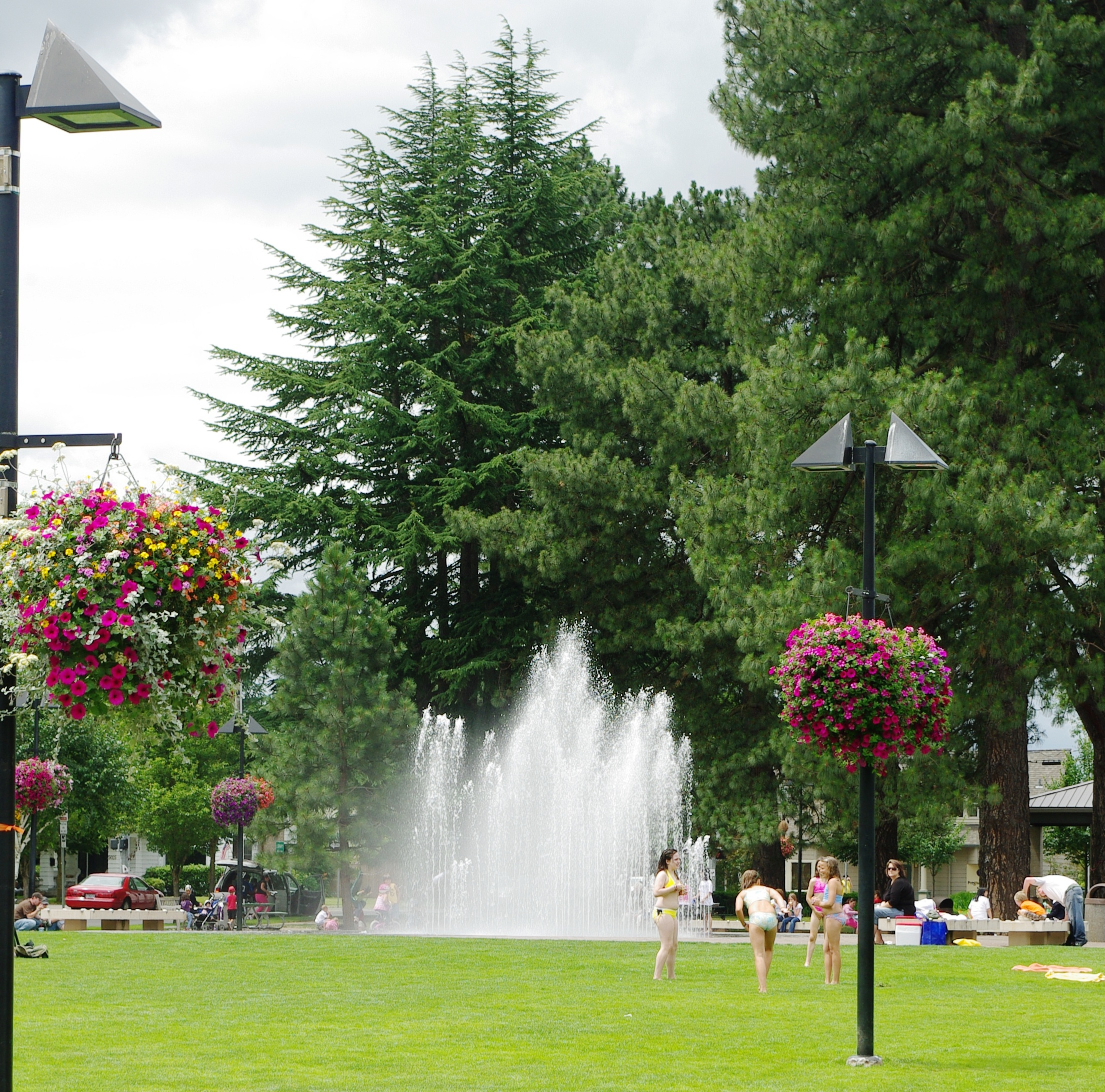
- The signature fountain at the park
- Interactive map of Beaverton City Park
- Location: Beaverton, Oregon, U.S.
- Coordinates: 45°29′02″N 122°48′20″W

Beaverton City Park, also known as City Fountain Park, is a park in front of the library building at Southwest Fifth Street and Southwest Hall Boulevard in downtown Beaverton, Oregon, in the United States.

In 1998, voters approved a bond for the library's construction; leftover project funds were used to build the fountain. Thomas Hacker Architects designed the park and library improvements, and the fountain was designed by Samson Hydrotechnical Fountain System Design. The fountain and park improvements were completed in 2001. Richard Taylor's sculpture Singing Sky was added to the park by the Beaverton Arts Commission.

== See also ==
- Fountains in Portland, Oregon
