= List of public art in Beaverton, Oregon =

List of public artworks in Beaverton, Oregon, U.S.

== Murals ==
- Broadway Street: 1910–1920 (2011), Bev Ecker
- Forest for the Trees murals (2017); three murals by Meg Adamson and Jennifer Parks, Blaine Fontana, and Drew Merritt
- Hernandez Mural (2009), Hector Hernandez and Merlo Station Students
- Larry Kangas Mural (29014), Larry Kangas (completed by Sandy Kangas and Allison McClay)
- Rather Severe Mural (2016), Rather Severe
- The School of Outdoor Learning (2011), Angelina Marino
- Steps to Wellness (2012), Angelina Marino
- Wilson Mural (2009), Gina Wilson

Source: City of Beaverton, Oregon

== Sculpture ==
- embrace your inner light (2016), Angela Ridgway
- Just the Two of Us, Katy McFadden
- Ribbon Candy (2014), Paul Vexler
- Singing Sky (2010), Richard Taylor
- Spinning Progress (2017), Reven Swanson
- Sun (2016), Jesse Swickard
- Three Creeks, One Will (2013), Devin Laurence Field

Source: City of Beaverton, Oregon
