= Flaming =

Flaming may refer to:

- Anything set aflame or on fire
- Flaming (Internet), the act of posting deliberately hostile messages on the Internet
- Fläming, a region in Germany
- "Flaming" (song), a 1967 song by Pink Floyd from their album The Piper at the Gates of Dawn
- An alternative, British, name for gassing

== See also ==
- Flame (disambiguation)
- Flamboyant (disambiguation)
