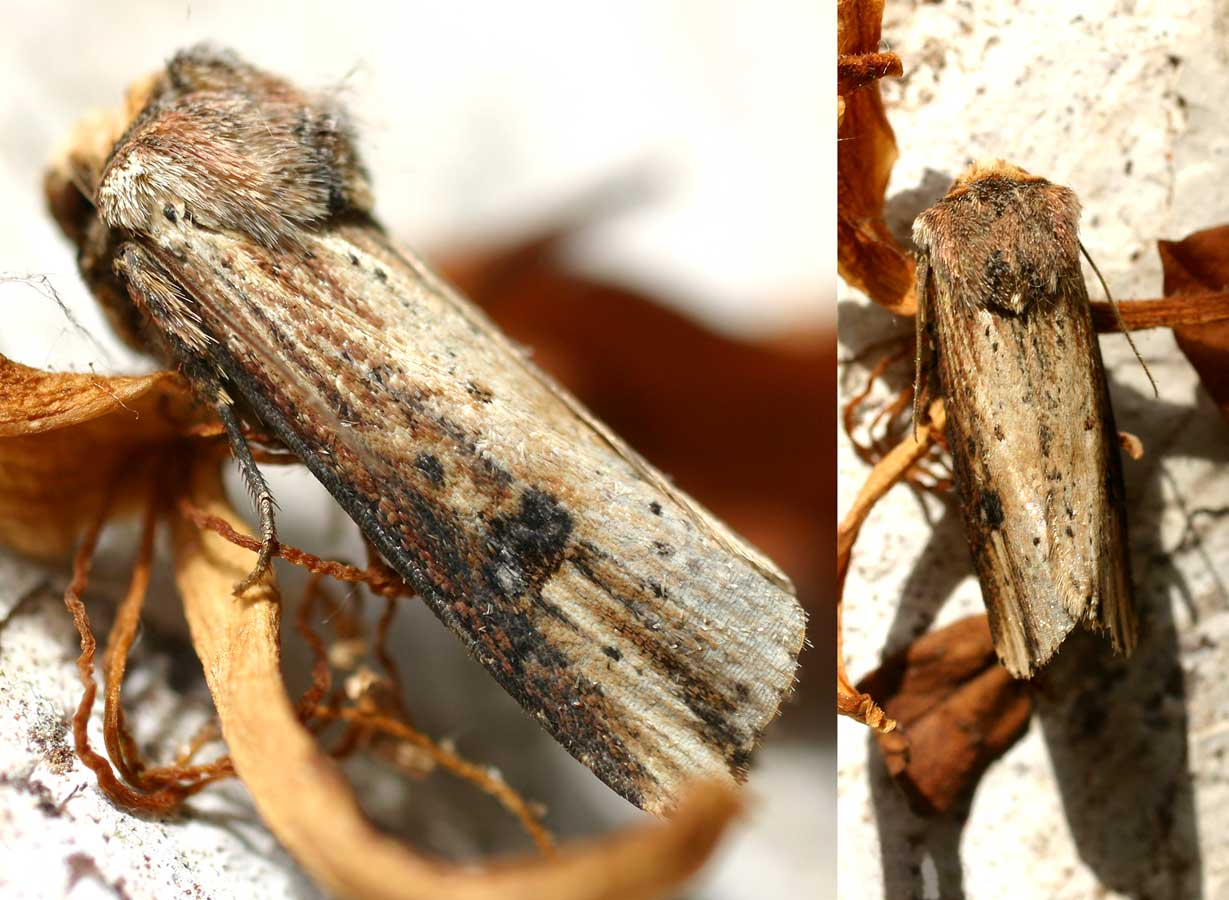

Scientific classification
- Kingdom: Animalia
- Phylum: Arthropoda
- Clade: Pancrustacea
- Class: Insecta
- Order: Lepidoptera
- Superfamily: Noctuoidea
- Family: Noctuidae
- Genus: Axylia
- Species: A. putris

Binomial name
- Axylia putris (Linnaeus, 1761)

= Axylia putris =

Flame

Species of moth

The flame (Axylia putris) is a moth of the family Noctuidae. It is found throughout Europe then east across the Palearctic to Armenia, western Siberia and Amur, Korea and Japan. The range extends into northern India.

This species has creamy-buff forewings (sometimes tinged with red) with black streaking along the costa. The hindwings are whitish with a dark line along the margin. The wingspan is 30–36 mm. Unusually for a noctuid, this moth rests with its wings wrapped tightly around its body making it resemble a broken twig. It flies at night in June and July (sometimes a second brood is produced which flies in September) and is attracted to light.

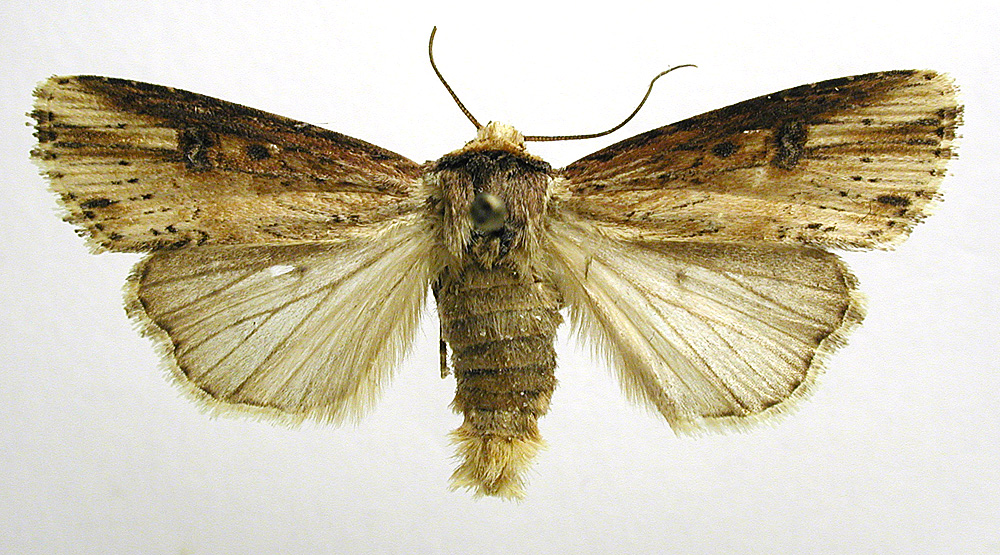
Mounted

Resembles a broken twig

== Description ==
Forewing ochreous, the costal area, including cell, dark brown; dark brown patches at the outer margin on both folds, the upper connected with outer line by a dark double streak; inner line strongly angulated; outer represented by a double row of vein-dashes: orbicular and reniform stigmata with dark centres and rings; the former small and round, more rarely flattened: the latter large; hindwing whitish, variably suffused with grey; — the form triseriata Moore, originally described from N. India, but occurring in Japan and Korea as well, is larger and darker.

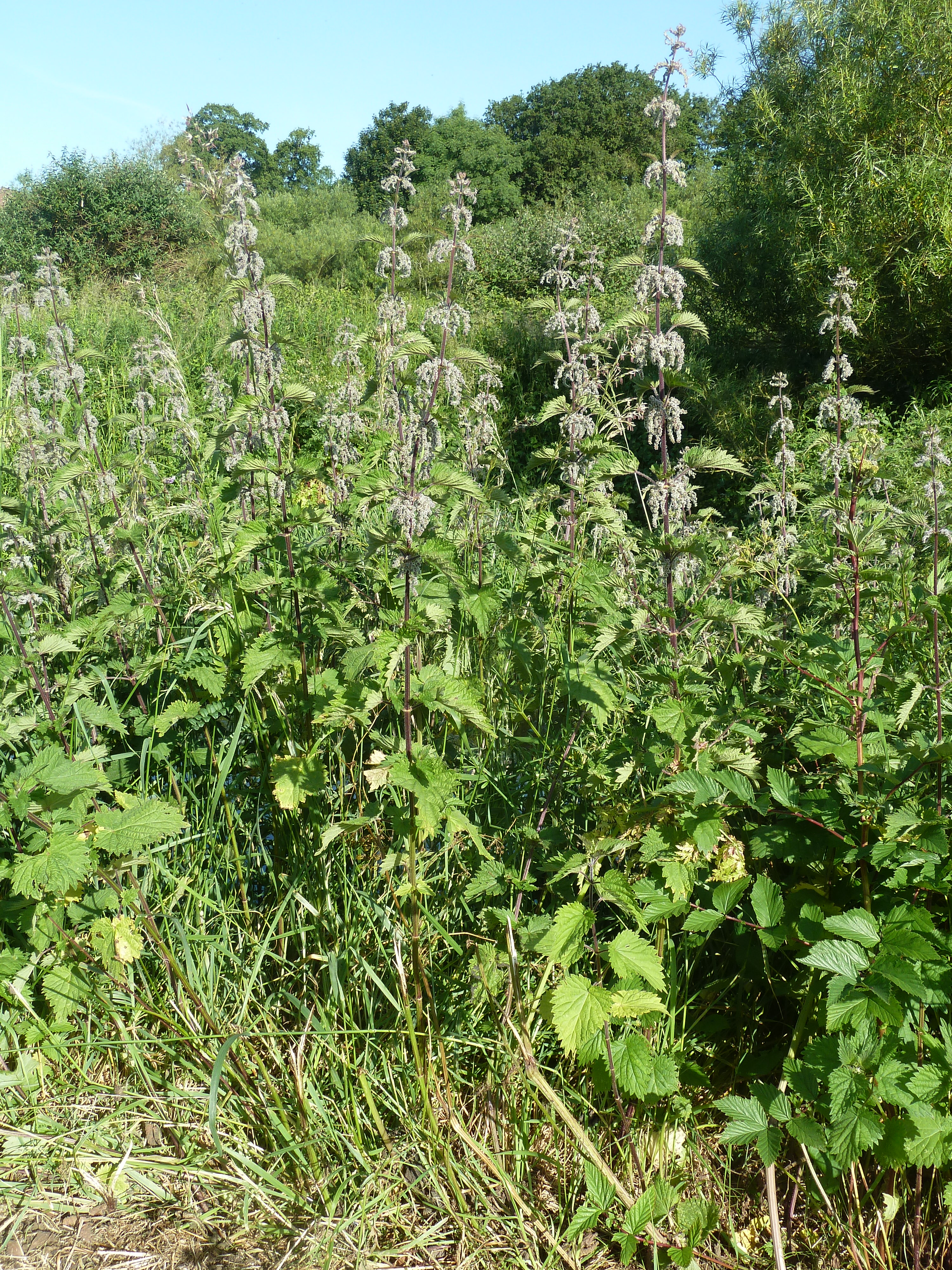
Habitat. Ireland

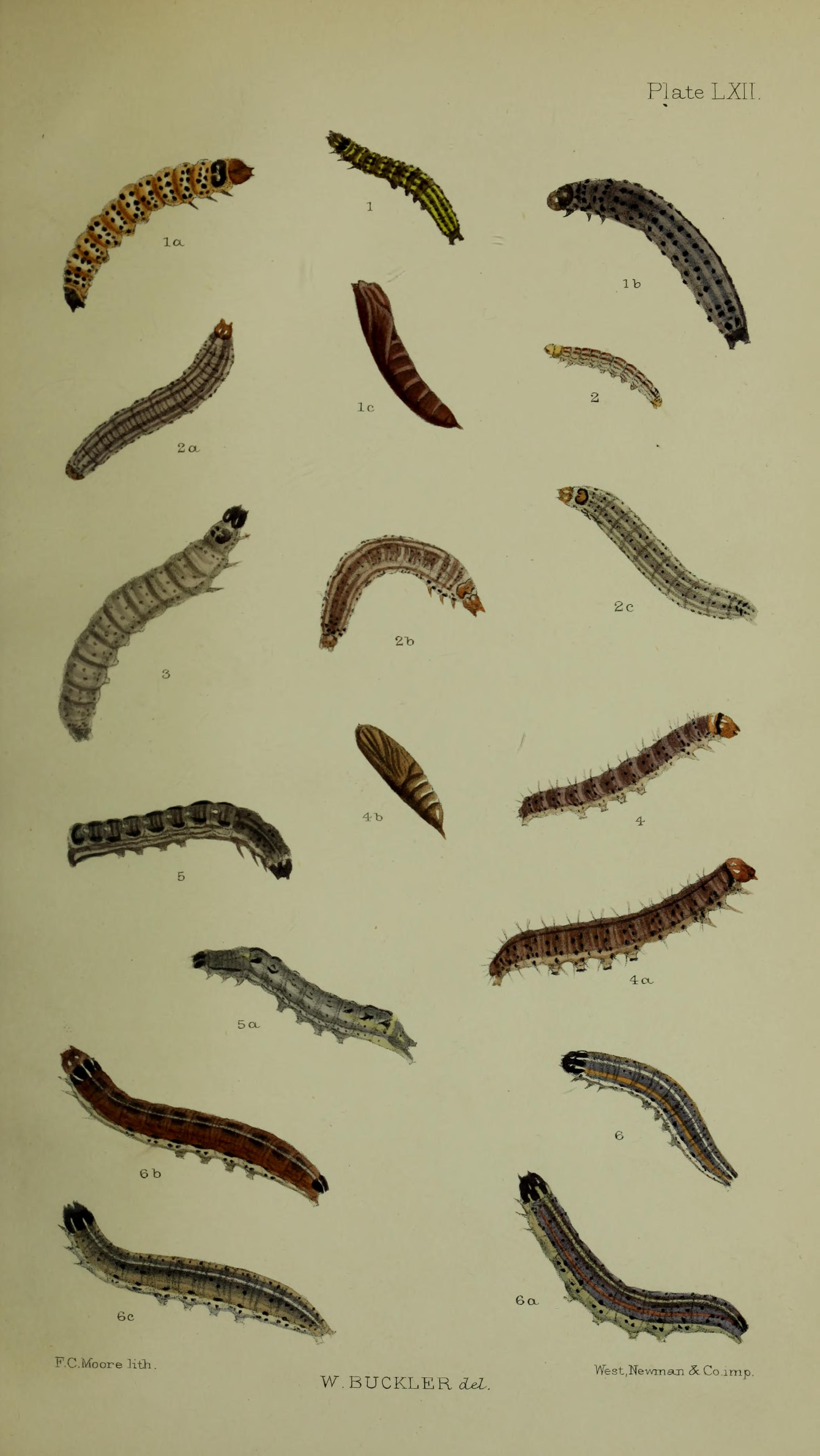
Figs.5, 5a larva after last moult

== Biology ==
The larva is grey or brown with black markings and a hump at the rear end. It feeds on a variety of cereals and other herbaceous plants (see list below). The species overwinters as a pupa.

1. The flight season refers to the British Isles. This may vary in other parts of the range.

== Recorded food plants ==
- Beta – beet
- Galium – bedstraw
- Hordeum – barley
- Lotus – bird's-foot trefoil
- Medicago – alfalfa
- Polygonum
- Rumex – dock
- Secale – rye
- Taraxacum – dandelion
- Trifolium – clover
- Triticum – wheat
- Urtica – nettle
- Vicia – vetch
