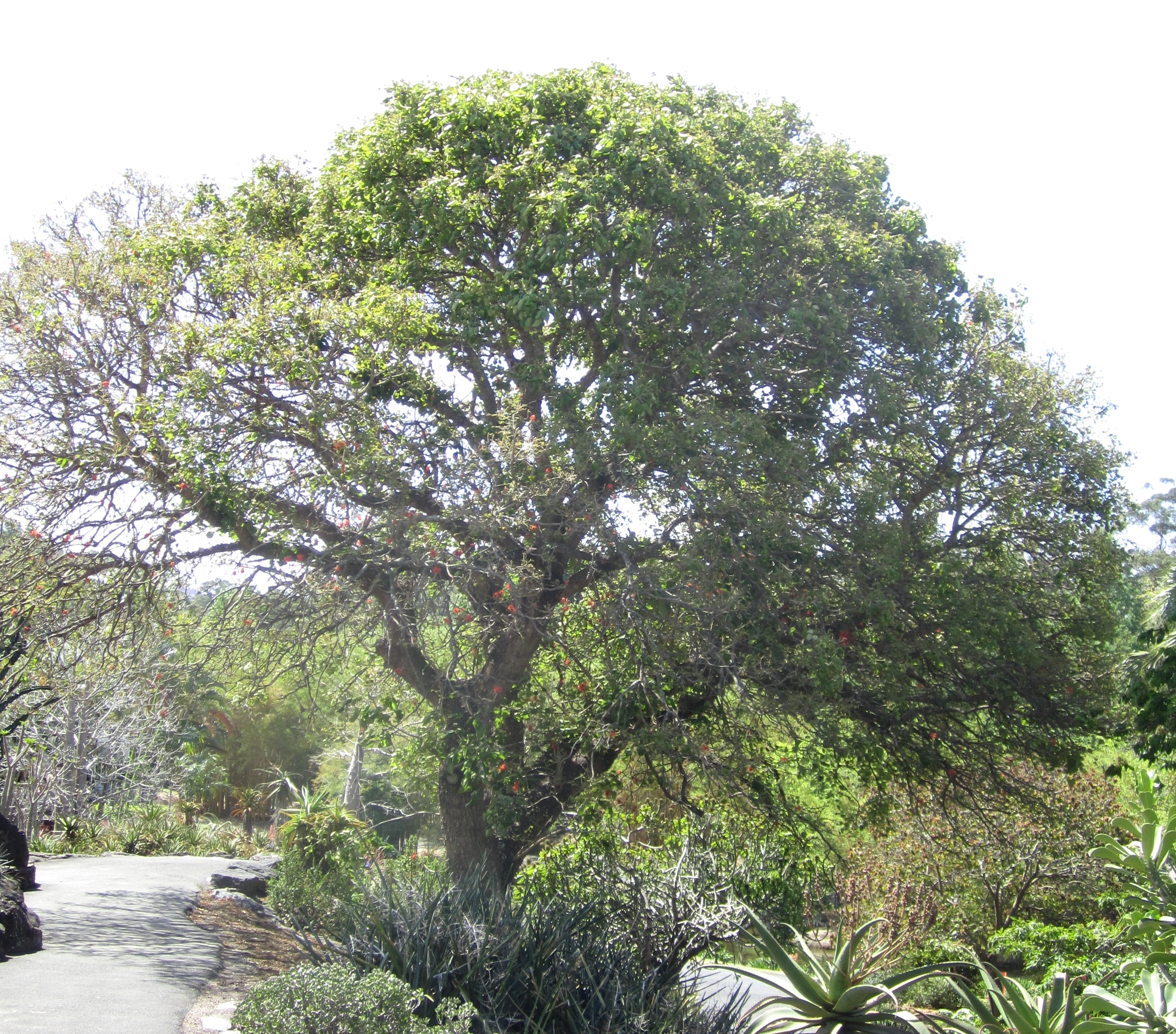

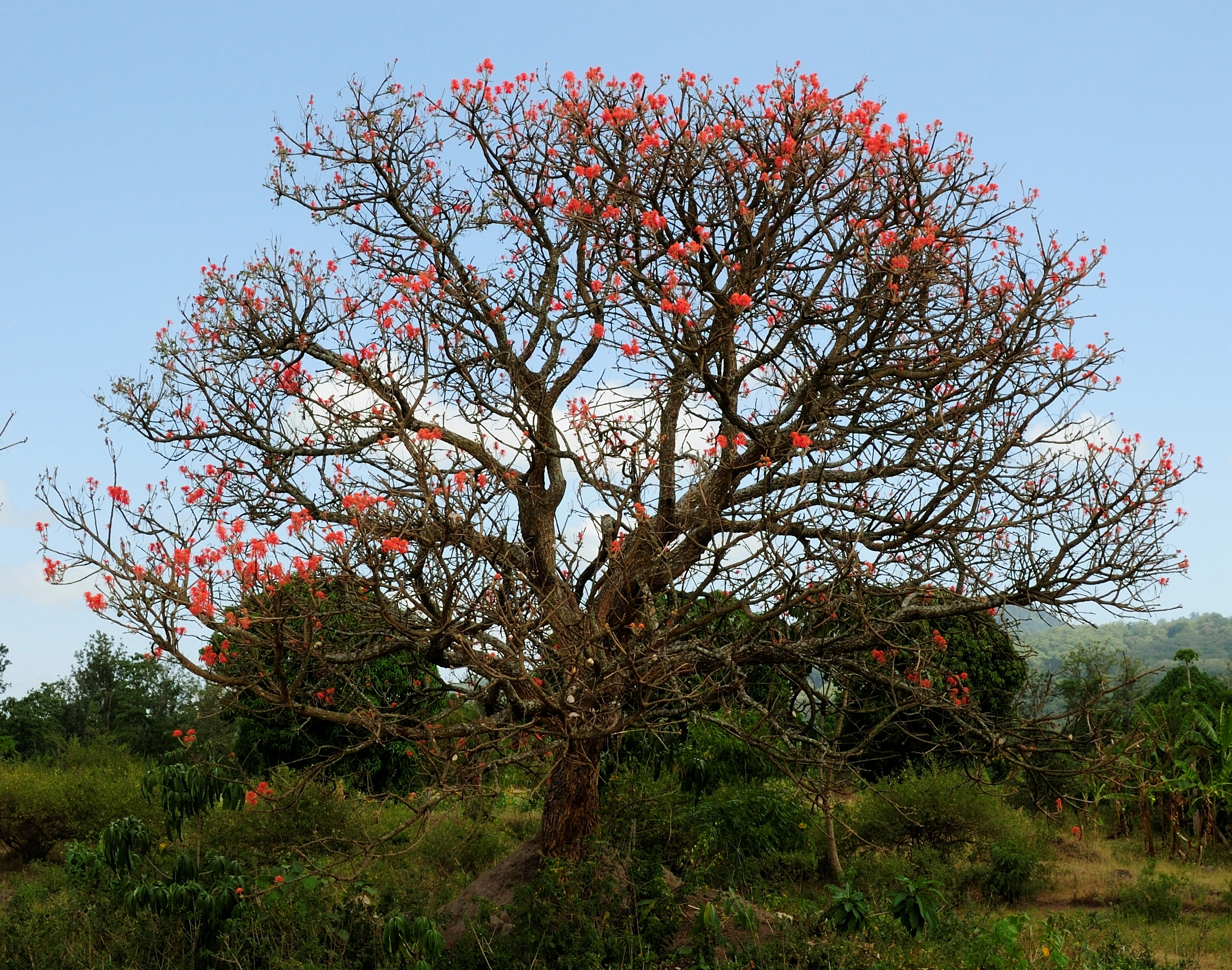
- Habit in leaf and in flower

Scientific classification
- Kingdom: Plantae
- Clade: Tracheophytes
- Clade: Angiosperms
- Clade: Eudicots
- Clade: Rosids
- Order: Fabales
- Family: Fabaceae
- Subfamily: Faboideae
- Genus: Erythrina
- Species: E. abyssinica

Binomial name
- Erythrina abyssinica Lam. ex DC.

Synonyms
- Erythrina tomentosa R.Br. Chirocalyx abyssinicus (Lam. ex DC.) Hochst. Chirocalyx tomentosus Hochst.

= Erythrina abyssinica =

Abyssinian coral tree

Species of legume

Erythrina abyssinica (lucky bean or flame tree) is a tree species of the genus Erythrina belonging to the plant family of the Fabaceae (or Leguminosae) described by Augustin Pyramus de Candolle in 1825. This leguminous tree species is native to East Africa, Eastern DRC and southern Africa. In Zimbabwe its range overlaps with the similar Erythrina latissima.

== History ==
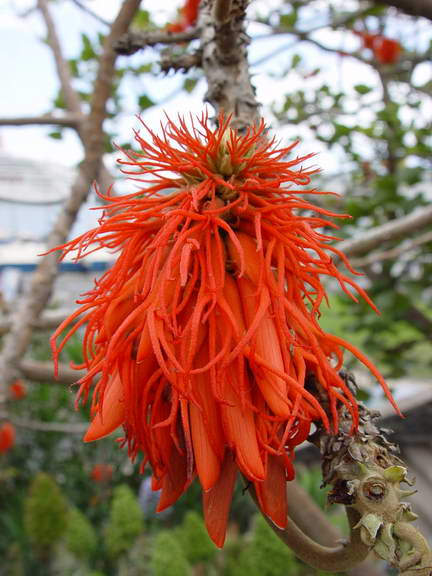
Close-up of inflorescence

The description of E. abyssinica has been complicated, because the first specimen of Erythrina from Ethiopia (Abyssinia) brought to Europe was actually a mix of the two species. The flowers and leaves belonged to E. brucei Schweinfurth (1868) and the pod and seeds to E. abyssinica Lam. ex DC (1825). In addition, the first three descriptions were invalid, i.e. not published correctly to the International Code of Nomenclature for algae, fungi, and plants (syn. E. kuara James Bruce (1790), E. abyssinica Lam. (1786) and E. tomentosa Robert Brown (1814)). Furthermore, the species is variable with individuals with glabrous and hairy (tomentose) leaves which were described separately and after revision resulted in additional synonyms (syn. E. tomentosa R. Brown ex A.Rich. (1847)). The number of synonyms increased when a new genus was described from South Africa (Chirocalyx Meisn.), which later was considered synonymous with Erythrina (Ch. tomentosa Hochstetter and Ch. abyssinica Hochstetter). Finally, E. abyssinica was considered for some time the juvenile stage of E. brucei and hence synonymous with the latter species. The issue was settled in 1962 when the pods and seeds from E. brucei were collected which were different from those of E. abyssinica. Consecutively, the seeds planted revealed that seedlings and saplings of E. brucei did not resemble those of E. abyssinica.

== Description ==
The flowers attract sunbirds. After it has finished flowering, it produces a seed capsule, which is long and cylindrical, and wood-like. It can be up to 30 cm long and contains bright red and black seeds.

== Uses ==
The seeds are used as fish poison and decoratively in necklaces. The soft wood of the trunk has been used to carve small statues and animals. The wood is also used for making beehives and African drums or Tam Tam.
