= Big Flame =

Big Flame may refer to:

- Big Flame (band), a post-punk three piece band, based in Manchester, England, active from 1983 to 1986.
- Big Flame (political group), a British left-wing political group active from 1970 to 1984.
- "Big Flame", a b-side to Welsh singer Duffy's singles, "Stepping Stone" and "Rain on Your Parade"
- The Big Flame, a 1969 BBC drama written by Jim Allen and produced by Ken Loach.
