= Three Creeks, One Will =

Sculpture in Beaverton, Oregon, U.S.

- The sculpture in 2022
- Artist: Devin Laurence Field
- Year: 2013
- Type: Sculpture
- Dimensions: 11 m (37 ft)
- Location: Beaverton, Oregon, United States; 45.49031°N 122.80724°W

Three Creeks, One Will is an outdoor 2013 sculpture by Devin Laurence Field, installed in Beaverton, Oregon, United States.

== Description and history ==
Devin Laurence Field's Three Creeks, One Will is a 37-foot (11 m), $60,000 art installation located at the South Plaza at The Round in Beaverton. Field's design was selected from a dozen candidates and unanimously approved by the Beaverton Artist Selection Committee in March 2013. The piece was installed on October 29, 2013. According to the artist, the blue and green cylindrical sculpture is inspired by the city's three creeks and serves as a tribute to Beaverton's history and future.

== See also ==
- 2013 in art
- List of public art in Beaverton, Oregon
