= Flacăra (disambiguation) =

Flacăra (Romanian for "The Flame") may refer to:

- Flacăra, a Romanian weekly magazine
- Flacăra Iaşului, a Romanian regional newspaper
- Flacăra lui Adrian Păunescu, a Romanian weekly magazine edited by Adrian Păunescu
- Flacăra Moreni, a Romanian sports club from Moreni
- Flacăra Ploieşti, a Romanian football club from Ploieşti
- Flacăra București, a Romanian football club from Bucharest
- Flacăra Petroşani, a Romanian football club from Petroşani
- Flacăra Mediaş, a Romanian professional football club from Mediaş
- Flacăra Stadium, a multi-use stadium in Moreni, Romania
- Flacăra pe Comori, also known as Flames on the Treasures, a 1988 Romanian film
