= Rocket (firework) =

Pyrotechnic firework

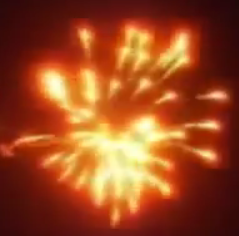
1.4 Consumer Display Rocket

A rocket is a pyrotechnic firework made out of a paper tube packed with gunpowder that is propelled into the air. Types of rockets include the skyrockets, which have a stick to provide stability during airborne flight; missiles, which instead rotate for stability or are shot out of a tube; and bottle rockets, smaller fireworks – 4 cm (1½ in) long, though the attached stick extends the total length to approximately 30 cm(12 in) – that usually contain whistle effects.

== History ==
Developed in the second-century BC, by the ancient Chinese, fireworks are the oldest form of rockets and the most simplistic. Originally fireworks had religious purposes but were later adapted for military purposes during the Middle Ages in the form of "flaming arrows." During the tenth and thirteenth centuries the Mongols and the Arabs brought the major component of these early rockets to the West: gunpowder. Although the cannon and gun became the major developments from the eastern introduction of gunpowder, a tickling of rockets also resulted. These rockets were essentially enlarged fireworks which propelled, further than the long bow or cannon, packages of explosive gunpowder. During the late eighteenth century imperialistic wars, Colonel Congreve, developed his famed rockets, which travel range distances of four miles. The "rockets' red glare" in the American national anthem records the usage of rocket warfare, in its early form of military strategy, during the inspirational battle of Fort McHenry, where many soldiers were killed because of the rockets.

== Popularity ==
Fireworks have remained popular in today's age due to the spectacle of colors and sounds they are so renowned for. The component of a rocket that produces these stars, reports ("bangs"), and colors is typically located just below the nosecone section of a rocket. After the rocket engine has consumed all of its fuel an internal fuse is lit that delays the release of the stars, or other effect. This delay allows for coasting time where the rocket continues its ascent. As gravity will eventually pull the firework back to earth, it slows and eventually reaches an apex (highest point: where velocity of the rocket is zero) and begins its descent. The delay usually lasts just before this apex, at an optimum velocity, where a small explosion shoots the firework's stars in desired directions and thus producing a brilliant effect. The colors, reports, flashes, and, stars are analogous to flavor one adds with spices (chemicals with special pyrotechnic properties) to a soup of otherwise bland gunpowder.

== Advantages and disadvantages ==
Gunpowder's relatively low specific impulse (amount of thrust per unit propellant) limits its capacity of thrust production on larger scales. Fireworks are the simplest of solid rockets and the weakest. Evolution from fireworks brought about more complex solid-fueled rockets, which use more exotic and powerful fuels. The low-explosive properties of gunpowder, relative to the high-explosive properties of more advanced solid fuels testify to the "survival of the fittest," as the use of firework-type engines (for purposes other than entertainment or education) has virtually ceased since the late nineteenth century. Yet with all these drawbacks fireworks will continue to maintain their use as a traditional pastime with an ongoing history of nearly 5,000 years.
