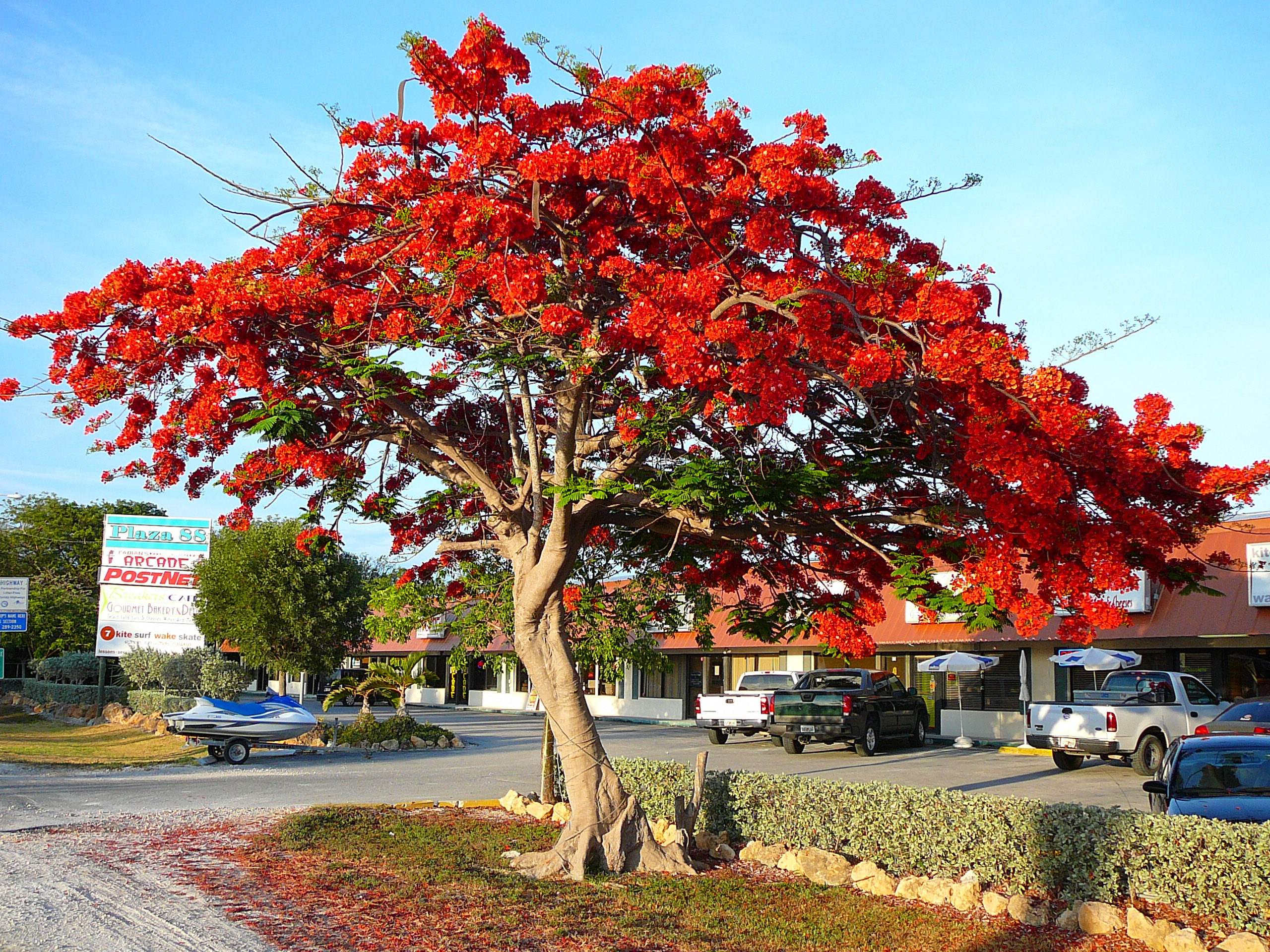
- Tree in full bloom (Florida Keys)

Conservation status
- Least Concern (IUCN 3.1)

Scientific classification
- Kingdom: Plantae
- Clade: Tracheophytes
- Clade: Angiosperms
- Clade: Eudicots
- Clade: Rosids
- Order: Fabales
- Family: Fabaceae
- Subfamily: Caesalpinioideae
- Genus: Delonix
- Species: D. regia

Binomial name
- Delonix regia (Boj. ex Hook.) Raf.

Synonyms
- Delonix regia var. flavida Stehle; Delonix regia var. genuina Stehle; Delonix regia var. genuina Stehlé; Poinciana regia Hook.; Poinciana regia Bojer

= Delonix regia =

Species of flowering plant in the bean family

Delonix regia is a species of flowering plant in the bean family Fabaceae, subfamily Caesalpinioideae native to Madagascar. It is noted for its fern-like leaves and flamboyant display of orange-red flowers over summer. In many tropical parts of the world it is grown as an ornamental tree. It is a non-nodulating legume.

Although its country of origin was unknown, it had been in widespread cultivation for centuries. Finally, in 1932, a natural colony was discovered on the west coast of Madagascar by J. Leandri.

== Common names ==
Its common names include "flame tree" (one of several species given this name), peacock flower, royal poinciana, flamboyant, phoenix tree, flame of the forest. The name poinciana comes from a genus it was once placed in named Poinciana after Phillippe de Longvilliers de Poincy, a French noble who once governed the Caribbean island of Saint Kitts.

== Description ==
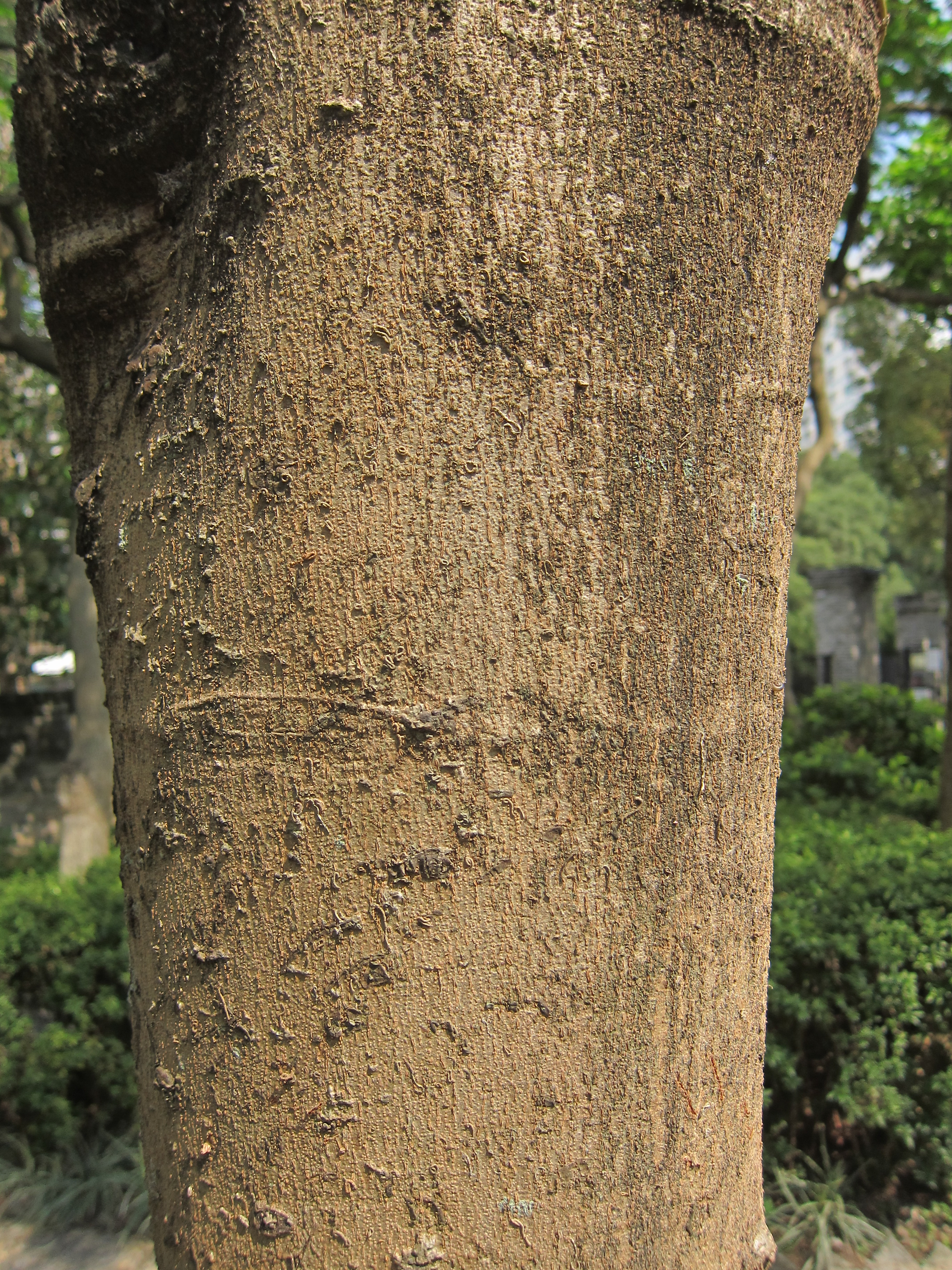
Close up of bark

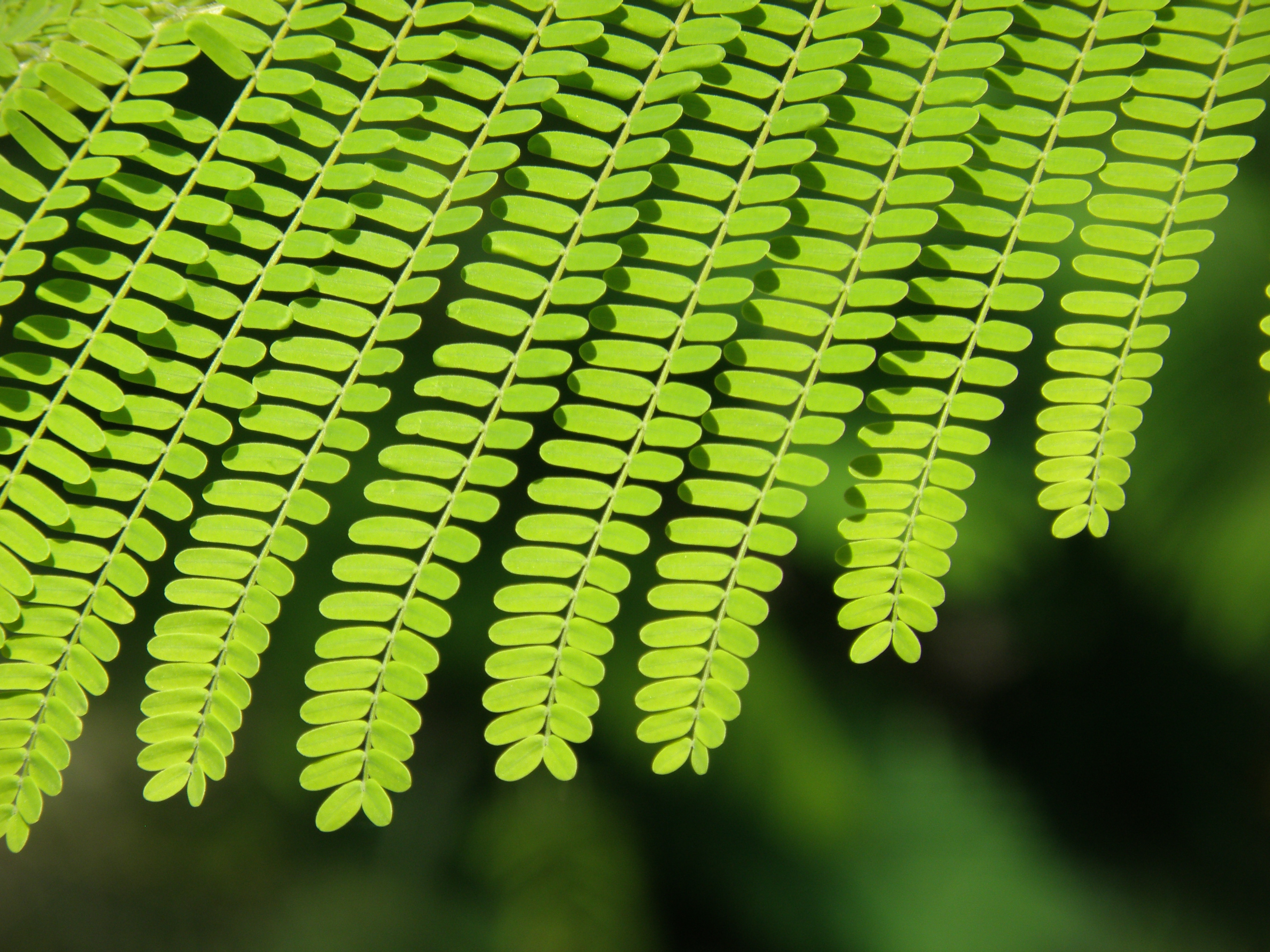
Close-up of part of a leaf

Delonix regia is a medium-sized deciduous tree that grows to about 10 m (33 ft). The bark is light brown. Often creased at branches, it has prominent lenticels. The foliage of one branch is made of 8–25 or more pairs of pinnae, each pinna is lined with 30–60 or more opposite leaflets. One leaflet is oblong with a length of 4–12 millimetres, it is dark green with a dull upper surface and a paler, greyish bottom.

The flowers are large, with four spreading scarlet or orange-red petals forming a diameter up to 8–11 cm (3–4 in) long, and a fifth upright petal called the standard, which is slightly larger and spotted with yellow and white. They appear in corymbs along and at the ends of branches. The naturally occurring variety flavida (Bengali: Radhachura) has yellow flowers.

The pods are green and flaccid when young, then turn dark-brown and woody as they mature. They can be up to 60 cm (24 in) long and 5 cm (2 in) wide. The seeds are small, weighing around 0.4 grams (6.2 grains) on average. The compound (doubly pinnate) leaves have a feathery appearance and are a characteristic light, bright green. Each leaf is 30–50 cm (12–20 in) long with 20 to 40 pairs of primary leaflets or pinnae, each divided into 10–20 pairs of secondary leaflets or pinnules. Pollen grains are elongated, approximately 52 μm in size.

In India, the trees are bare during the winter months from December to February. New leaves start to form in March–April. Flowers start to appear in April, reaching full bloom in May. Fruit pods are present for many months.

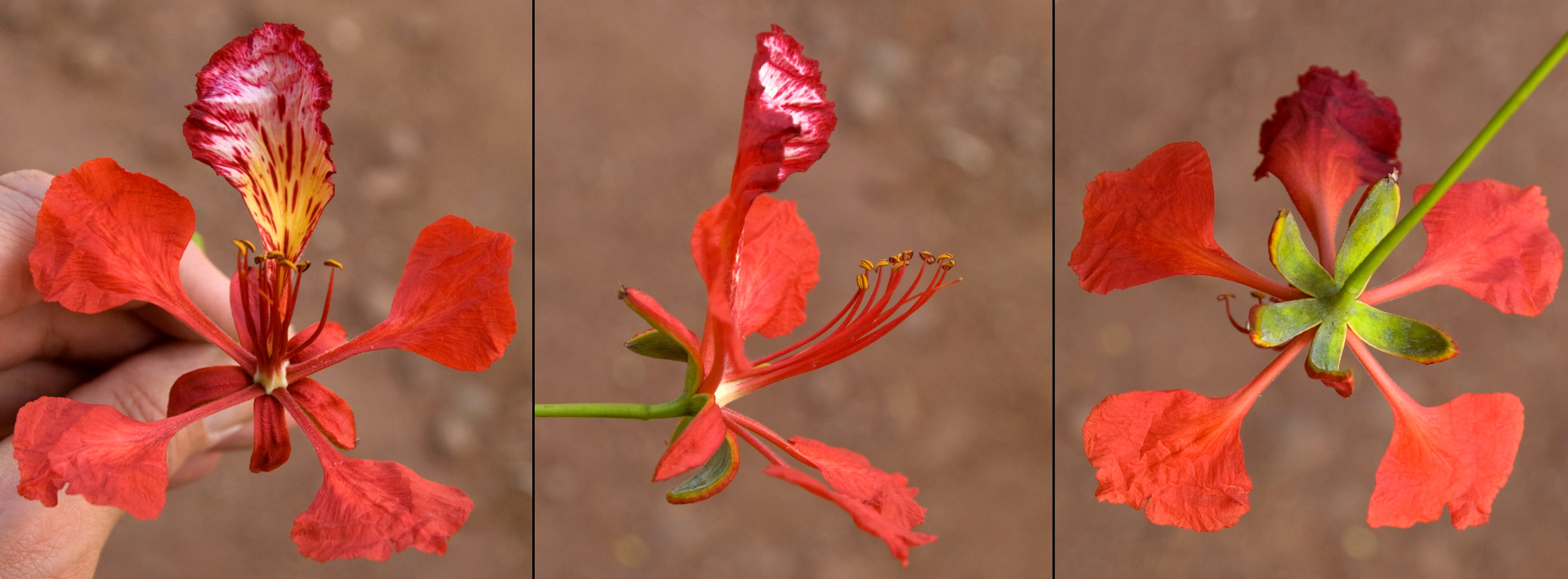
Frontal, lateral and rear views of a flower

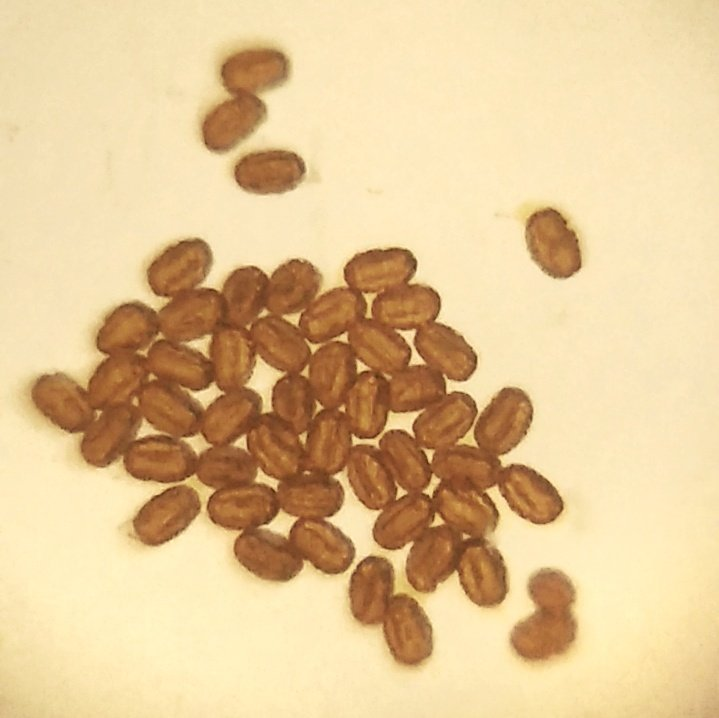
Pollen grains of Delonix regia

== Distribution ==
Delonix regia is endemic to Madagascar's dry deciduous forests, but has been introduced into tropical and sub-tropical regions worldwide. In the wild it is endangered, but it is widely cultivated elsewhere and is regarded as naturalised in many of the locations where it is grown.

=== Africa ===
Trees are planted along streets and villages within Madagascar as an ornamental. Outside Madagascar, it is present in the Horn of Africa, including Somalia, as well as in several Southern African countries such as South Africa, Zimbabwe, Malawi, Zambia and Namibia.

=== North America ===
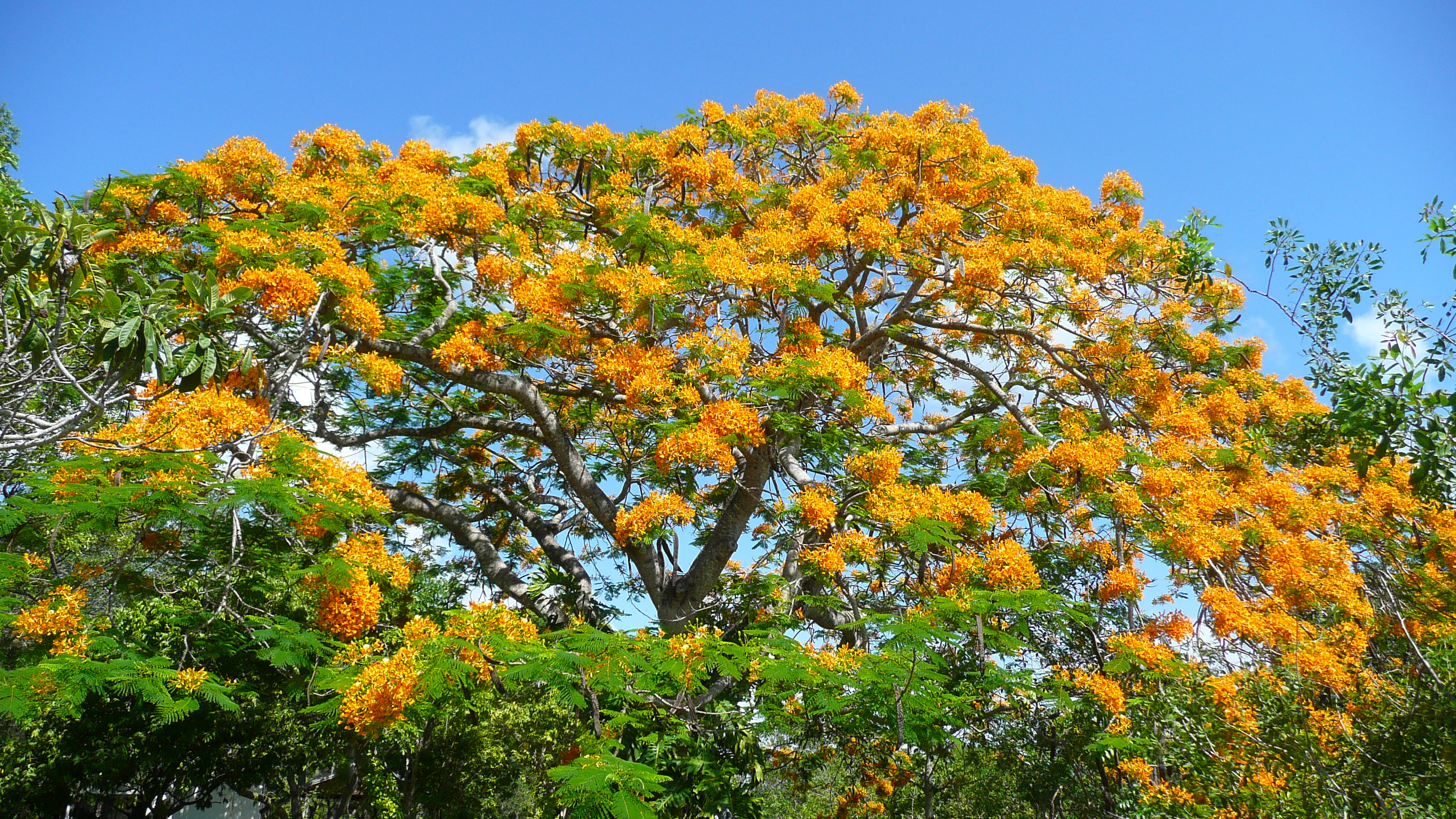
Delonix regia var. flavida is a rarer, yellow-flowered variety.

In the continental United States, it grows in South Florida, Central Florida, in the Rio Grande Valley of South Texas and can be found planted as far north as Houston. Hawaii is another location where the species is grown. It also grows in humid parts of Mexico, especially in the southeast states like Campeche, Chiapas, Oaxaca, Tabasco, Veracruz, and Yucatán.

=== Caribbean and Central America ===
In the Caribbean it is featured in many Dominican and Puerto Rican paintings. It can also be found in Belize, The Bahamas, Costa Rica, Cuba, Haiti, Honduras, Nicaragua, the U.S. Virgin Islands, Sint Maarten, Trinidad and Tobago, the Cayman Islands, Grenada, Jamaica, Curaçao, Dominica, Saint Vincent and the Grenadines and Saint Lucia. It is the national flower of St. Kitts and Nevis. It can also be found in Bermuda. The town of Peñuelas, Puerto Rico, located about 12 miles or 19 kilometers west of Ponce, is nicknamed El Valle de los Flamboyanes ("The Valley of the Poinciana Trees"), as many flamboyant trees are found along the surrounding Río Guayanes, Río Macana, and Río Tallaboa rivers.

=== South America ===
It grows in Argentina, Brazil, Ecuador, and Paraguay and Peru, where it is planted as a street tree.

=== Europe and the Middle East ===
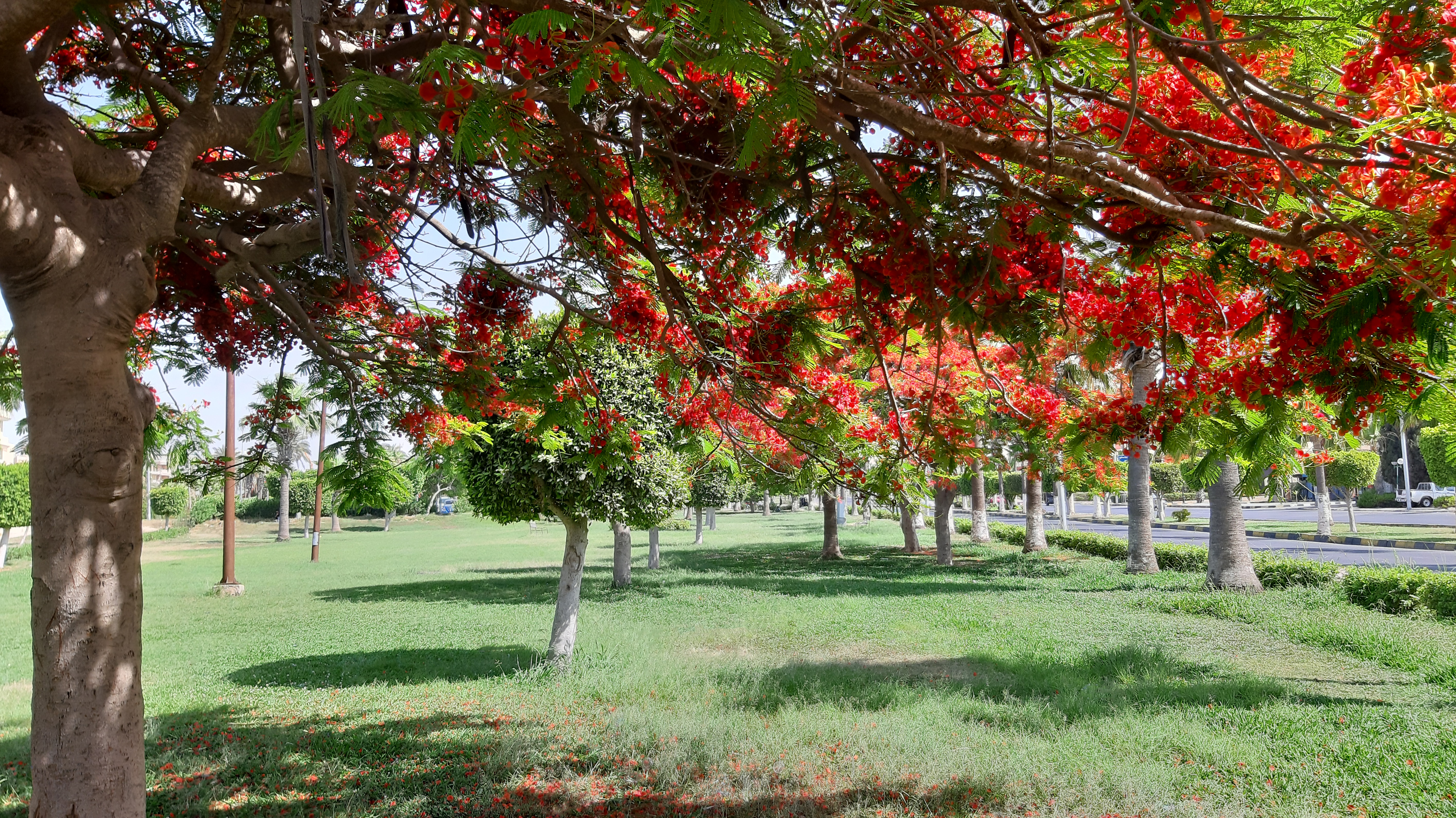
Delonix regia (New Borg El Arab, Egypt)

Delonix regia is planted in Mediterranean parts of Europe, the Middle East and North Africa, including United Arab Emirates, the southern coast of Spain, the Valencian coast, the Canary Islands, Lebanon, Egypt, Iran, Palestine, Israel, Jordan, Cyprus and Saudi Arabia.

=== Indian subcontinent ===
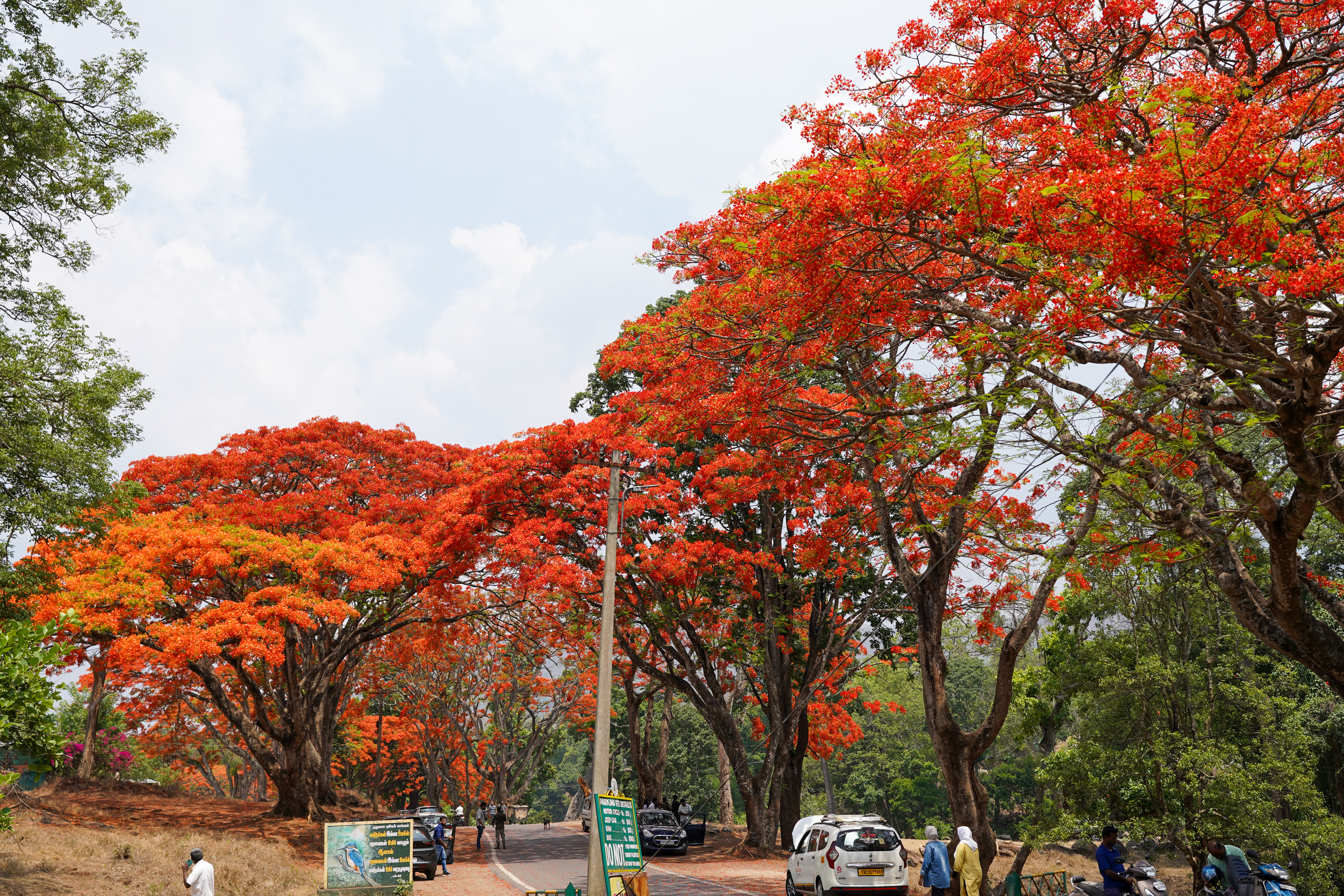
Flowering trees, Theppakadu, Tamil Nadu, India

The tree is planted in India, where it is referred to as the May-flower tree, Gulmohar or Gul Mohr. In West Bengal and Assam it is called Krishna Chura (কৃষ্ণচূড়া), while its known as Nianbānā/Krushnachuṛā (ନିଆଁବାଣ/କୃଷ୍ଣଚୂଡ଼ା) in Odisha. In Sri Lanka it is known in Sinhala as the Maara tree, although for a short while it was known as the Lamaasuriya tree after Le Mesurier, the British civil servant who was responsible for introducing it as a shade tree. It is also grown in Karachi, Pakistan. In Mauritius and La Réunion it announces the coming of the new year.

In Bangladesh it is known as krisnachura (কৃষ্ণচূড়া). You can find this tree in various places in Bangladesh. It is found all over Dhaka City and is one of the iconic symbols of the Bengali month of Boishakh. In Nepal it is known as Shirish.

=== Southeast Asia ===
In Myanmar, where it is called sein pan (စိန်ပန်း), the time of flowering is March in the south and early to late April in the north. It is planted in gardens and as a roadside tree. In Myanmar, this tree is a sign of the Thingyan Festival (13–16/17 April). In the Philippines, its flowering signals the imminent arrival of the monsoon rains. It also grows in Thailand and Indonesia. In Vietnam it is called "phoenix flower" and mostly grows in Haiphong. In Malaysia, it is called "Semarak", which used to be the name of a street in the country's capital city, Kuala Lumpur, now renamed as Jalan Sultan Yahya Petra where one of the oldest and highest ranked Malaysian universities, the University of Technology Malaysia's Kuala Lumpur campus is located. "Semarak Api" is also the official flower of the Sepang district.

=== East Asia ===
It grows in Southern China such as in Hong Kong. It is the official tree in Tainan, Taiwan; Xiamen, Fujian Province, and Shantou, Guangdong Province, People's Republic of China. National Cheng Kung University, a university located in Tainan, included royal poinciana on its emblem.

=== Australia ===
It is very widely grown in Northern Australia, in the southern extremes previously limited to South East Queensland where it is a popular street tree in the suburbs of Brisbane. It blooms successfully in Sydney and other parts of New South Wales.

=== Micronesia ===
It grows in Guam, and is the official tree of the Commonwealth of the Northern Mariana Islands.

=== South Pacific ===
It is a commonly planted ornamental shade tree in parks in New Caledonia, and is now also found in the sub-tropical forests near major towns such as the capital, Noumea. When it is in flower, it is a prominent sight along the route between Noumea and its international airport at Tontouta.

== Cultivation ==
=== Required conditions ===
The royal poinciana requires a tropical or near-tropical climate, but can tolerate drought and salty conditions. It thrives in open, free-draining sandy or loamy soil enriched with organic matter. The tree does poorly in heavy or clay soils, and flowers more profusely when kept slightly dry.

=== Propagation ===
==== Seeds ====
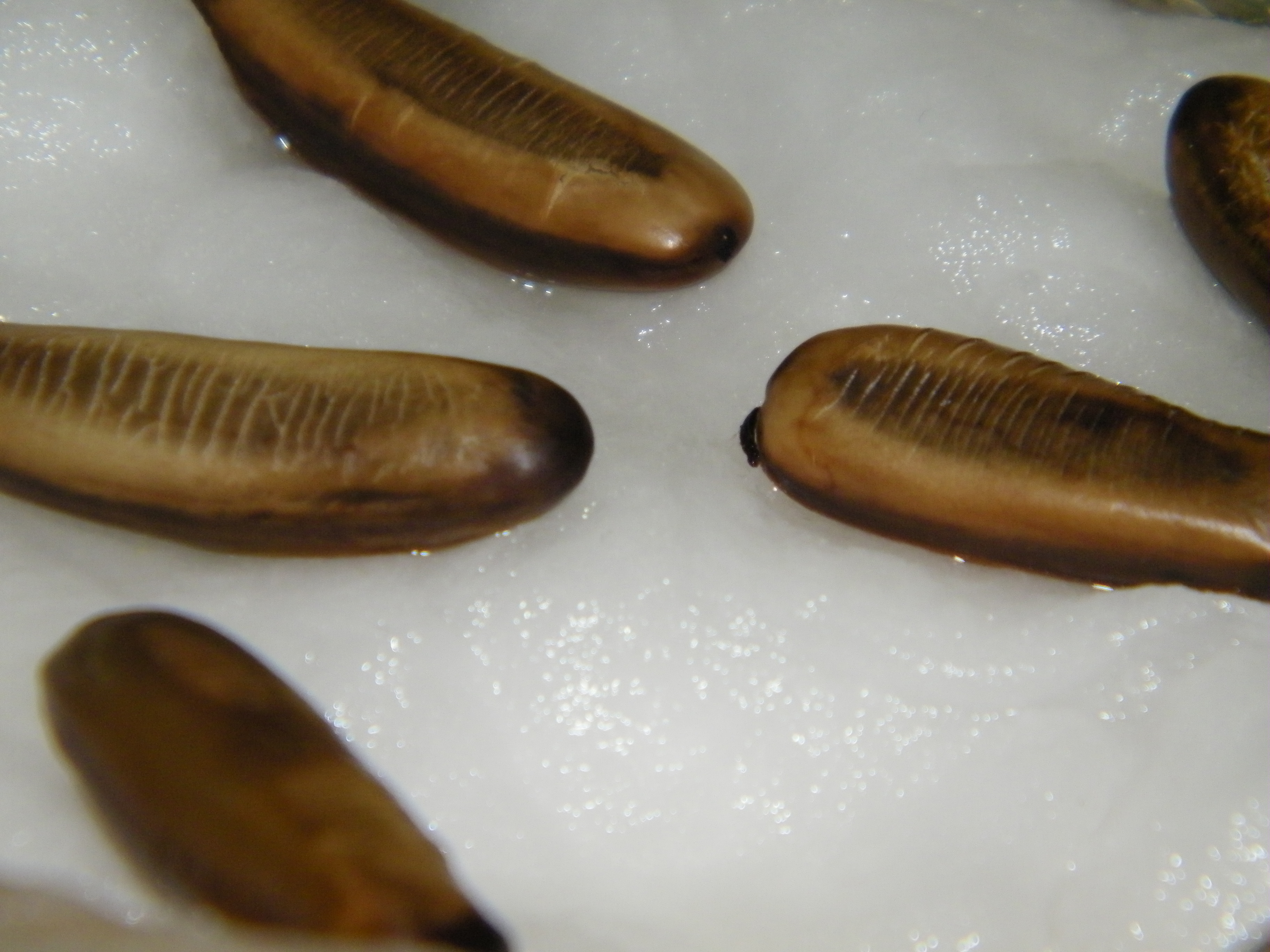
Seeds after soaking in water for 6 days

The royal poinciana is most commonly propagated by seeds. Seeds are collected, soaked in warm water for at least 24 hours, and planted in warm, moist soil in a semi-shaded, sheltered position. In lieu of soaking, the seeds can also be "nicked" or "pinched" (with a small pair of scissors or nail clipper) and planted immediately. These two methods allow moisture to penetrate the tough outer casing, stimulating germination. The seedlings grow rapidly and can reach 30 cm (12 in) in a few weeks under ideal conditions.

==== Cuttings ====
Less common, but just as effective, is propagation by semi-hardwood cuttings. Branches consisting of the current or last season's growth can be cut into 30 cm (12 in) sections and planted in a moist potting mixture. This method is slower than seed propagation (cuttings take a few months to root) but is the preferred method for ensuring new trees are true to form. As such, cuttings are a particularly common method of propagation for the rarer yellow-flowering variety of the tree.

=== Uses ===
In addition to its ornamental value, it is a useful shade tree in tropical conditions, because it usually grows to a modest height (mostly 5 m or 15 ft, but it can reach a maximum height of 12 m or 40 ft) but spreads widely, and its dense foliage provides full shade. In areas with a marked dry season, it sheds its leaves during the drought, but in other areas it is virtually evergreen.

== Cultural significance ==
Delonix regia, natively called the gulmohar (Hindi: गुलमोहर, romanized: gulamōhara, lit. 'the seal of the flower') is the state tree of Delhi.

In the Indian state of Kerala, royal poinciana is called kaalvarippoo (കാൽവരിപ്പൂവ്, kālvarippūv) which means "the flower of Calvary". There is a popular belief among Saint Thomas Christians of Kerala that when Jesus was crucified, there was a small royal poinciana tree nearby his Cross. It is believed that the blood of Jesus Christ was shed over the flowers of the tree and this is how the flowers of royal poinciana got a sharp red color. It is also known as Vaaga in many areas of Kerala.

Its blossom is the national flower of St. Kitts and Nevis, and in May 2018 the royal poinciana was adopted by the city of Key West as its official tree. Known locally as semarak api, Delonix regia is the city flower of Sepang, Selangor, Malaysia.

In Vietnam, this is a popular urban tree and is called Phượng vỹ, or "phoenix's tail". Its flowering season is May–July, which coincides with the end of the school year in Vietnam. Because of this timing, the flower of poinciana is sometimes called the "pupil's flower". The tree is also commonly found on school grounds in Vietnam; however, after several incidents where a tree fell onto students, with one student killed, schools started cutting down or severely pruning the trees. Hải Phòng is nicknamed Thành phố hoa phượng đỏ ("City of red poinciana").

The song "Poinciana" was inspired by the presence of this tree in Cuba.

In South India, these trees are common in schools, so children used to play with the stamens of the bud.

== Gallery ==
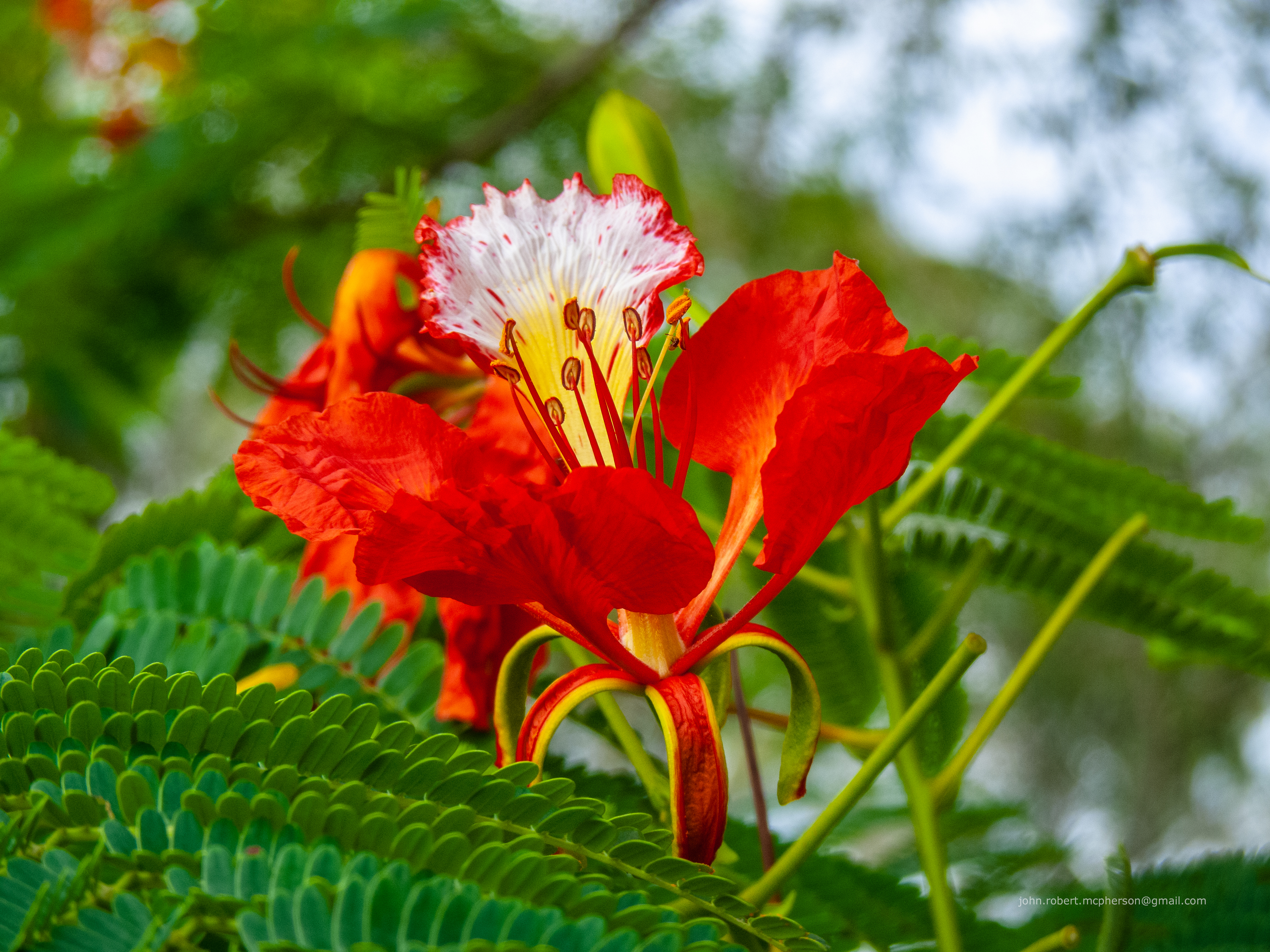
Newly opened flower with clear white and pale yellow petals, streaked with red, at the top.

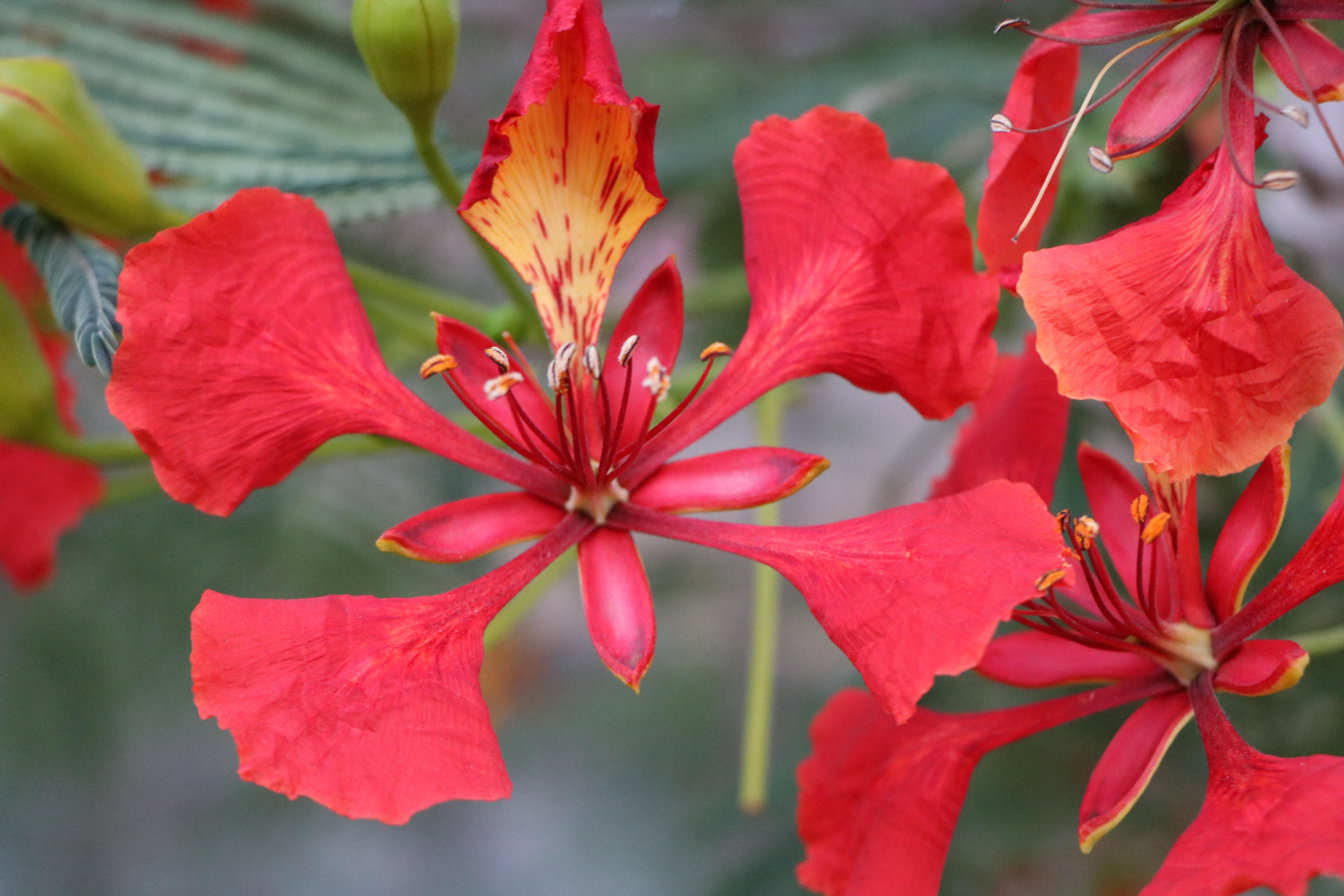
Pollinated flower with top petal curling and turning yellow

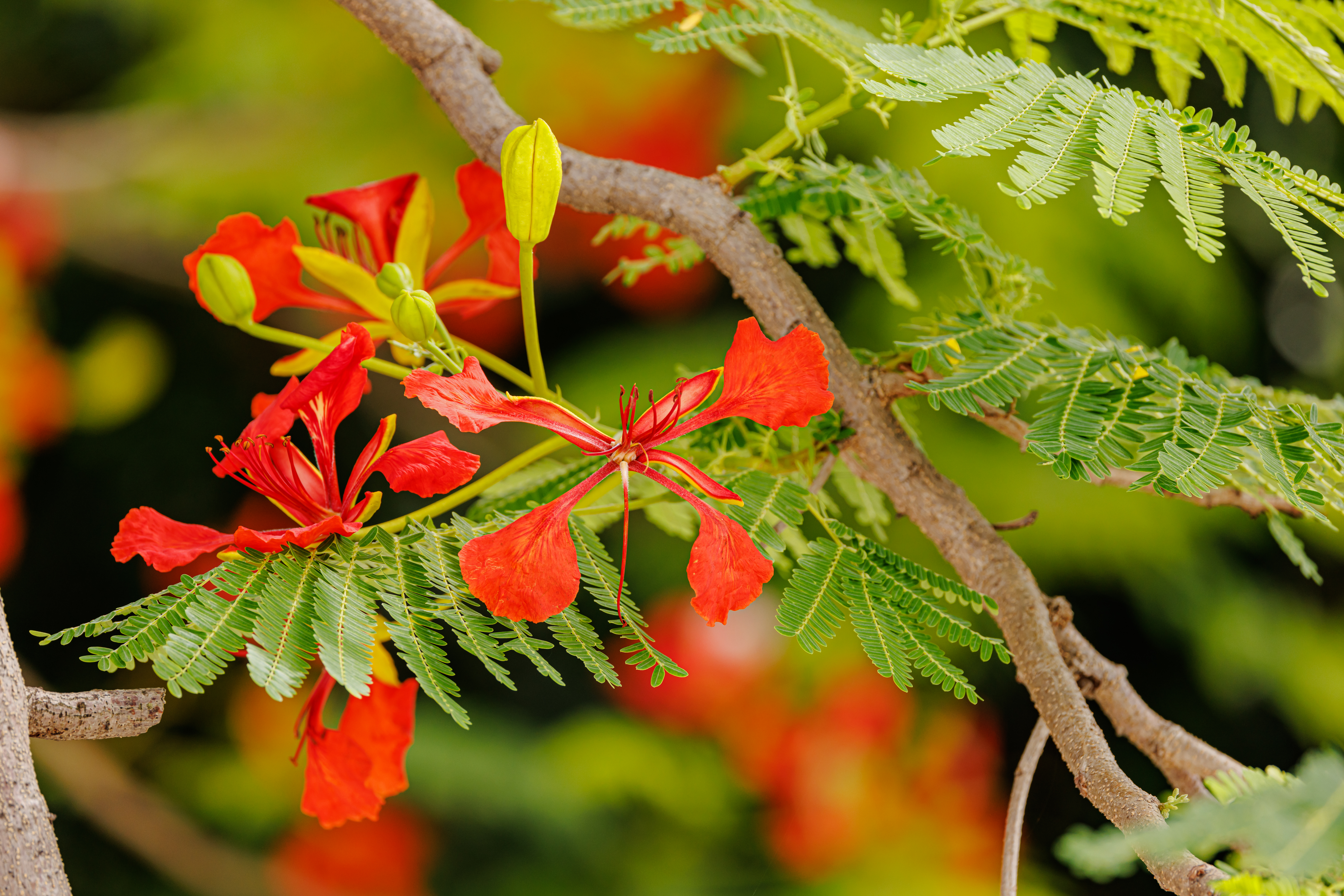
Flower dropping its petals

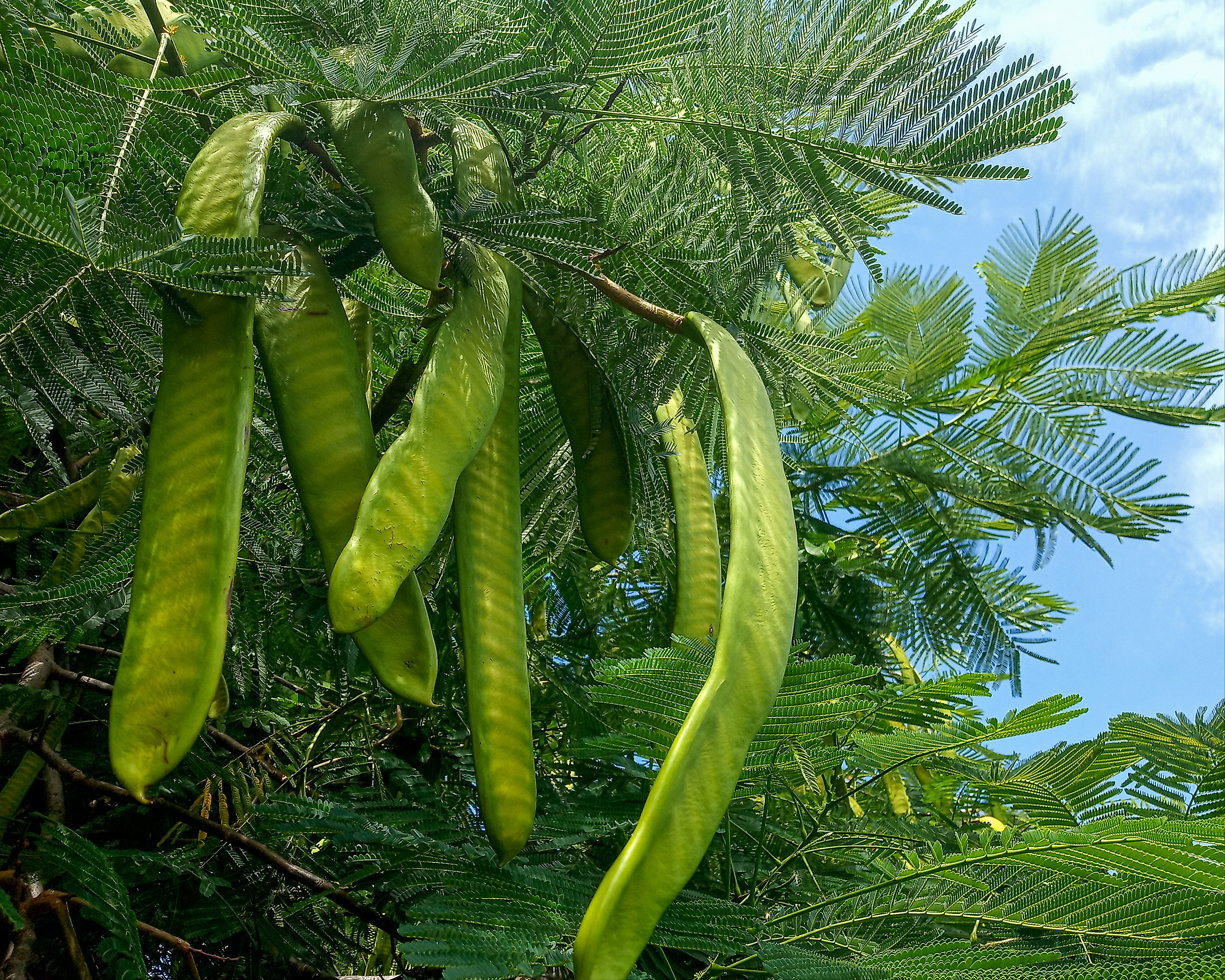
Green seed pods

Germinating seeds showing developing roots and cotyledons

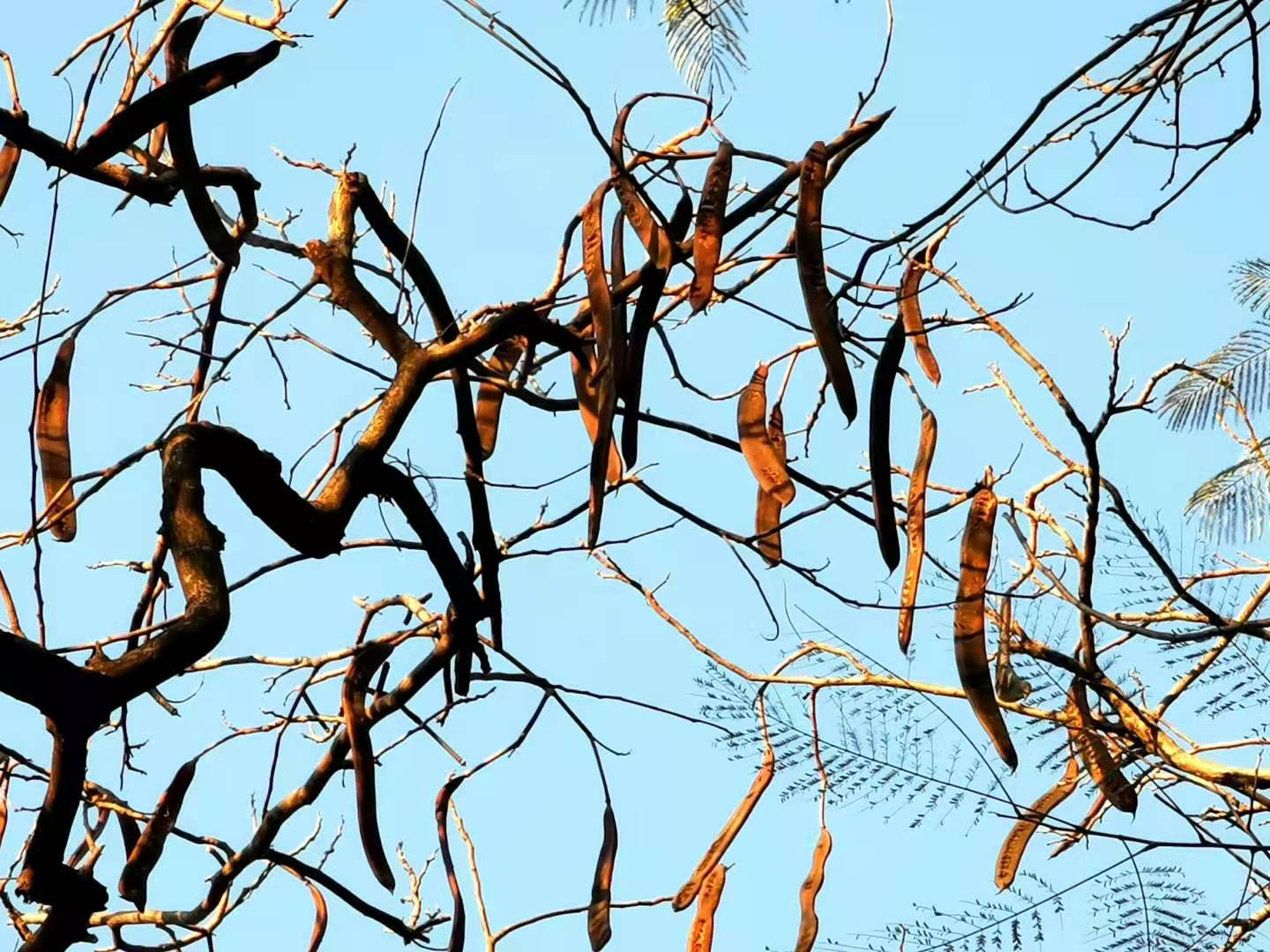
Brown seed pods with new leaves and flowers as the tree comes out of dry season dormancy
