= Honokiol =

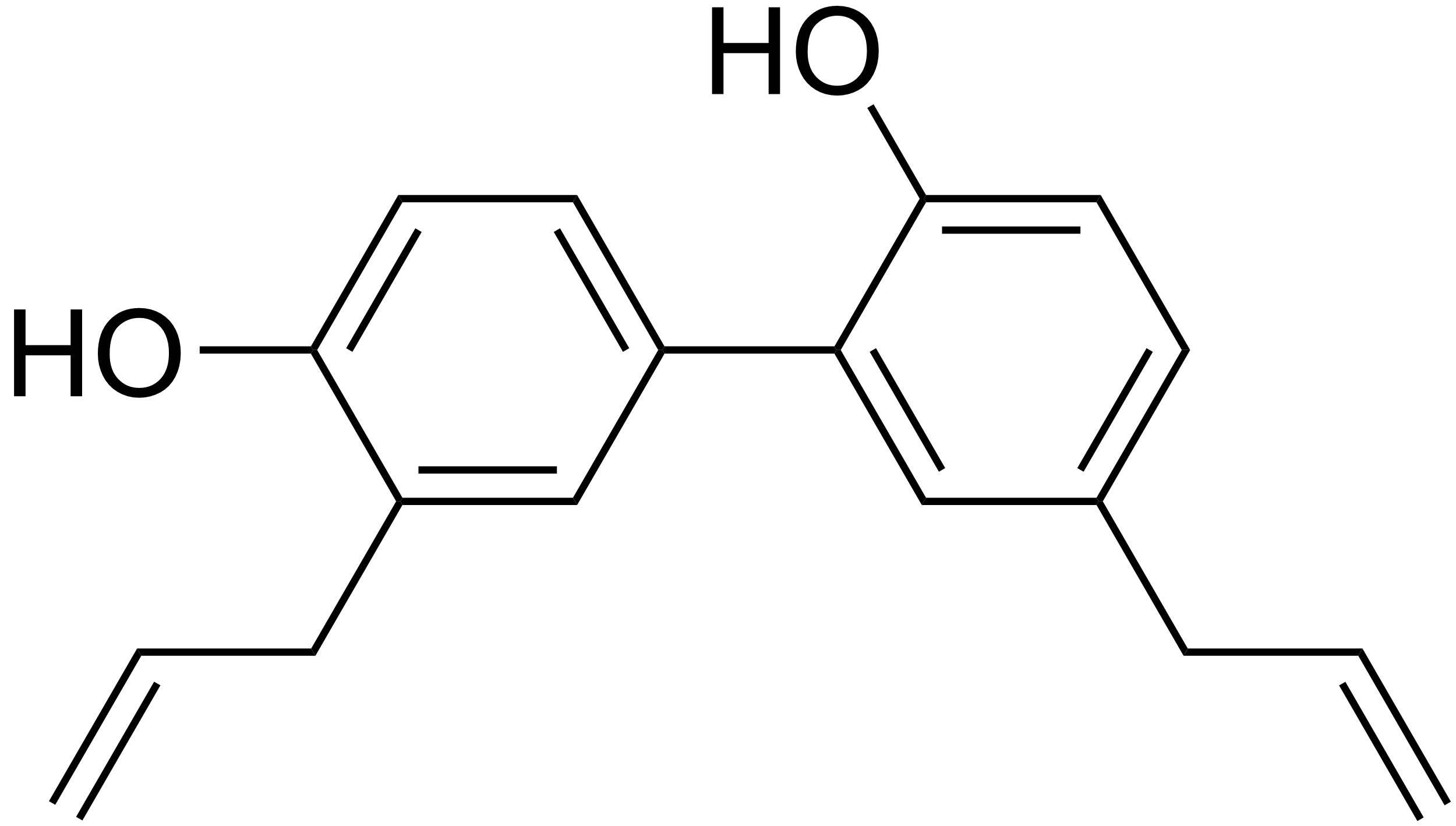

Names
- Preferred IUPAC name 3′,5-Di(prop-2-en-1-yl)[1,1′-biphenyl]-2,4′-diol
- Other names houpa, hnk

Identifiers
CAS Number	35354-74-6
3D model (JSmol)	Interactive image
ChEMBL	ChEMBL16901
ChemSpider	65254
ECHA InfoCard	100.122.079
KEGG	C10630
PubChem CID	72303
UNII	11513CCO0N
CompTox Dashboard (EPA)	DTXSID30188845
- InChI: InChI=1S/C18H18O2/c1-3-5-13-7-9-18(20)16(11-13)14-8-10-17(19)15(12-14)6-4-2/h3-4,7-12,19-20H,1-2,5-6H2 Key: FVYXIJYOAGAUQK-UHFFFAOYSA-N; InChI=1/C18H18O2/c1-3-5-13-7-9-18(20)16(11-13)14-8-10-17(19)15(12-14)6-4-2/h3-4,7-12,19-20H,1-2,5-6H2 Key: FVYXIJYOAGAUQK-UHFFFAOYAL
- SMILES: Oc1ccc(cc1C/C=C)c2cc(ccc2O)C\C=C

Properties
Chemical formula	C_{18}H_{18}O_{2}
Molar mass	266.334 g/mol
Appearance	White solid
Solubility in water	sparingly (25 °C)

Related compounds
Related biphenols	diethylstilbestrol, dihydroxyeugenol
Related compounds	magnolol, 4-O-Methylhonokiol
- Except where otherwise noted, data are given for materials in their standard state (at 25 °C [77 °F], 100 kPa). verify (what is ?) Infobox references

Honokiol is a lignan isolated from the bark, seed cones, and leaves of trees belonging to the genus Magnolia. It has been identified as one of the chemical compounds in some traditional Eastern herbal medicines along with magnolol, 4-O-methylhonokiol, and obovatol.

Honokiol, a compound with a spicy odor extracted from various Magnolia species worldwide, including those native to the Southeastern United States and Mexico, can readily cross the blood-brain and cerebrospinal fluid barriers, making it a highly bioavailable and potentially effective therapeutic agent. Honokiol is a small, hydrophobic neolignan biphenol structurally similar to propofol that can be purified efficiently from its isomer magnolol using advanced chromatography techniques such as magnolol acetonide protection followed by flash chromatography or high-capacity high-speed countercurrent chromatography.

Extracts from the bark and seed cones of Magnolia trees have been traditionally used in Chinese, Korean, and Japanese medicine as analgesics and treatments for anxiety and mood disorders, notably in formulas like Houpu in Chinese medicine and Kampo in Japan. Honokiol is a pleiotropic natural compound under preliminary research for antitumor, anti-inflammatory, antioxidant, neuroprotective, and antithrombotic properties, showing therapeutic potential across the central nervous system, cardiovascular system, and gastrointestinal system, though it may pose bleeding risks in patients with hemophilia, Von Willebrand disease, or those on anticoagulant therapy.

== Biology ==
Honokiol has been extracted from a number of species of Magnolia native to many regions of the globe. Magnolia grandiflora, which is native to the Southeastern United States, as well as Mexican species like Magnolia dealbata have been found to be sources of honokiol. Traditionally in Asian medicine, the Magnolia biondii, Magnolia obovata, and Magnolia officinalis are commonly used. The compound itself has a spicy odor.

Because of its physical properties, honokiol can readily cross the blood–brain barrier and the blood–cerebrospinal fluid barrier. As a result, honokiol is a potentially potent therapy with high bioavailability.

== Chemistry ==
=== Structure ===
Honokiol belongs to a class of neolignan biphenols. As a polyphenol it is relatively small and can interact with cell membrane proteins through intermolecular interactions like hydrogen bonding, hydrophobic interactions, or aromatic pi orbital co-valency. It is hydrophobic and readily dissolved in lipids. It is structurally similar to propofol.

=== Purification ===
There are several methods for purifying and isolating honokiol. In nature, honokiol exists with its structural isomer magnolol, which differs from honokiol only by the position of one hydroxyl group. Because of the very similar properties of magnolol and honokiol, purification has often been limited to a HPLC or electromigration. However, methods developed in 2006 by workers in the lab of Jack L. Arbiser, took advantage of the proximity of the phenolic hydroxyl groups in magnolol, which form a protectable diol, to generate a magnolol acetonide (Figure 1), with a subsequent simple purification via flash chromatography over silica.

Figure 1

Magnolol and honokiol are normally inseparable. Honokiol is easily separable from the protected magnolol acetonide.

Additionally a rapid separation approach was published in the Journal of Chromatography A in 2007. The process uses high-capacity high-speed countercurrent chromatography (high-capacity HSCCC). Through this method honokiol can be separated and purified to above 98% purity with a high yield in under an hour.

== History ==
=== Traditional medicine ===
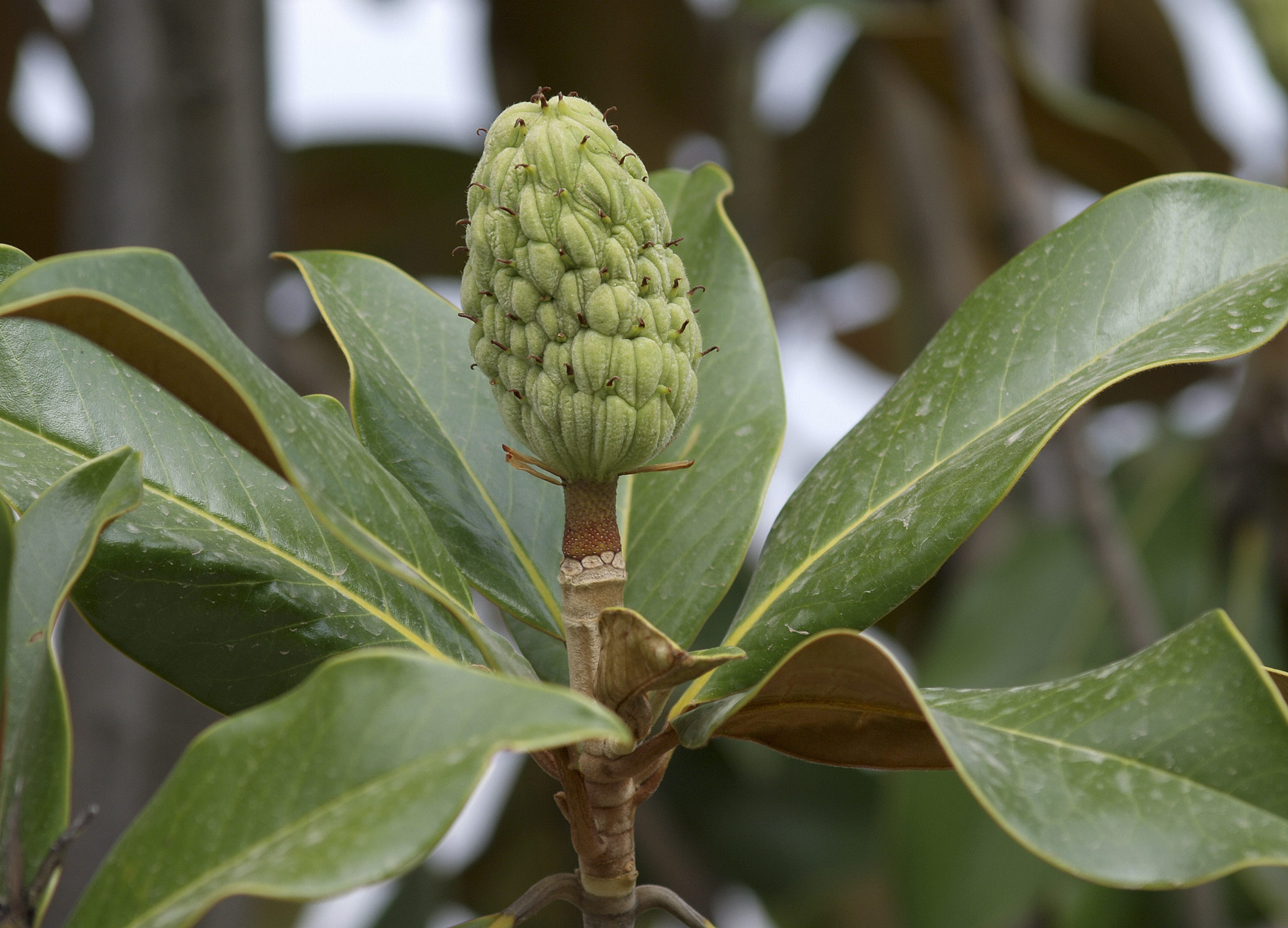
Seed cone

Extracts from the bark or seed cones of the Magnolia tree have been widely used in traditional medicine in China, Korea, and Japan.

Magnolia bark has traditionally been used in Eastern medicine as analgesic and to treat anxiety and mood disorders. In traditional Chinese medicine, magnolia bark is called Houpu and is most commonly taken from two species, Magnolia obovata and Magnolia officinalis. Some Chinese traditional formulas containing Houpu include Banxia Houpu Tang (半夏厚朴丸), Xiao Zhengai Tang, Ping Wei San (平胃散) and Shenmi Tang. Japanese Kampo formulas include Hange-koboku-to (半夏厚朴湯) and Sai-boku-to (柴朴湯).

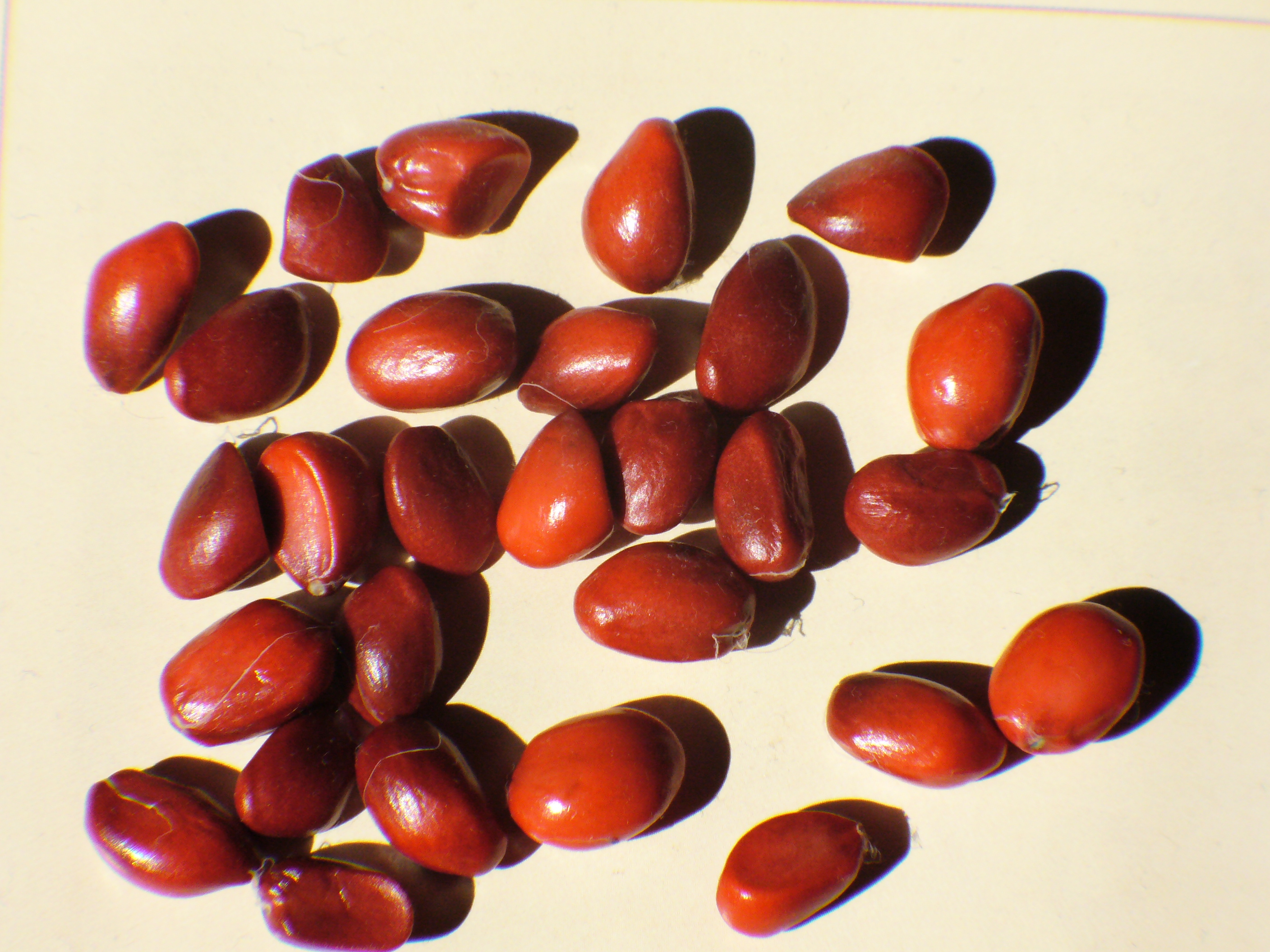
Seeds

== Western medical research ==
Honokiol is a pleiotropic compound, meaning it is able to act on the body through a number of pathways. This diversity of interaction makes it a viable therapy for a number of conditions in the central nervous system, cardiovascular system, and gastrointestinal system. It has been shown to have antitumorigenic, anti-inflammatory, and antioxidant effects as well.

=== Side effects and contraindications ===
Research has shown a limited side effect profile for honokiol, and it appears to be well tolerated. However, its antithrombotic effects could cause hemorrhage especially in patients with conditions that would put them at a higher risk like hemophilia or Von Willebrand disease. Additionally, patients already taking anticoagulants should talk to their doctor before taking honokiol supplements. In a 2002 study, researchers induced cell death in fetal rat cortical neurons by directly applying 100μM in vitro.

=== Pharmacology ===
==== Antitumorigenic activities ====
Honokiol has shown pro-apoptotic effects in melanoma, sarcoma, myeloma, leukemia, bladder, lung, prostate, oral squamous cell carcinoma, in glioblastome multiforme cells and colon cancer cell lines. Honokiol inhibits phosphorylation of Akt, p44/42 mitogen-activated protein kinase (MAPK), and src. Additionally, honokiol regulates the nuclear factor kappa B (NF-κB) activation pathway, an upstream effector of vascular endothelial growth factor (VEGF), MCL1, and cyclooxygenase 2 (COX-2), all significant pro-angiogenic and survival factors. Honokiol induces caspase-dependent apoptosis in a TRAIL-mediated manner, and potentiates the pro-apoptotic effects of doxorubicin and other etoposides. So potent is honokiol's pro-apoptotic effects that it overcomes even notoriously drug resistant neoplasms such as multiple myeloma and chronic B-cell leukemia. Honokiol also acts on the PI3K/mTOR pathway in tumor cells while maintaining pathway activity in T cells.

==== Neurotrophic activity ====
Honokiol has been shown to promote neurite outgrowth and have neuroprotective effects in rat cortical neurons. Additionally, honokiol increases free cytoplasmic reforforason Ca^{2+} in rat cortical neurons. Honokiol is a weak CB2 receptor ligand but the naturally occurring derivative 4-O-methylhonokiol was shown to be a potent and selective cannabinoid CB2 receptor inverse agonist and to possess antiosteoclastic effects.

==== Antithrombotic activity ====
Honokiol inhibits platelet aggregation in rabbits in a dose-dependent manner, and protects cultured RAEC against oxidized low density lipoprotein injury. Honokiol significantly increases the prostacyclin metabolite 6-keto-PGF1alpha, potentially the key factor in honokiol's antithrombotic activity.

==== Anti-inflammatory activity ====
Studies examining honokiol as a protective therapy against focal cerebral ischemia-reperfusion injury have identified a number of anti-inflammatory pathways. Neutrophil infiltration of injured tissues can cause further damage and issues with healing. In in vitro studies, honokiol reduced fMLP (N-formyl-methionyl-leucyl-phenylalanine) and PMA (phorbol-12-myristate-13-acetate) induced neutrophil firm adhesion which is an integral step for infiltration. Honokiol inhibits ROS production in neutrophils. Honokiol also blocks inflammatory factor production in glial cells through the inhibition on NF-κB activation. This mechanism is believed to suppress production of NO, tumor necrosis factor-α (TNF-α), and RANTES/CCL5.

==== Antioxidant activity ====
Honokiol has also been proposed as an antioxidant. The compound protects against lipid peroxidation by interfering with ROS production and migration. Accumulation of ROS extracellularly causes macromolecular damage while intracellular accumulation may induce cytokine activation.

==== Cytotoxicity inhibition ====
One way that honokiol acts as a neuroprotective is through cellular regulation and subsequent inhibition of cytotoxicity. Two mechanisms used to achieve this inhibition are GABA_{A} Modulation and Ca^{2+} Inhibition. Cytotoxicity inhibition may be the neuroprotective mechanism of honokiol. Honokiol has also been shown to inhibit repetitive firing by blocking glutamate.

===== GABA_{A} modulation =====
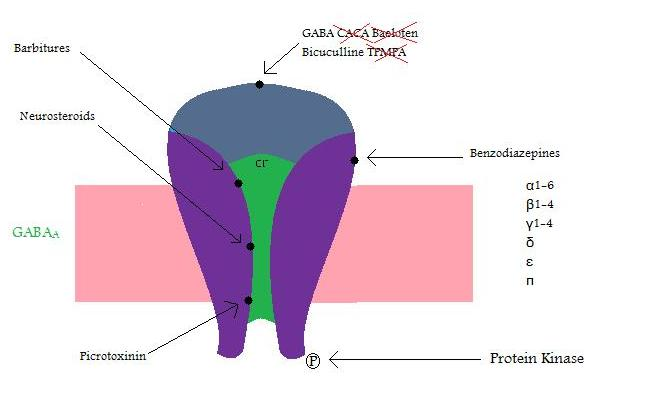
GABA_{A} receptor binding sites

It is believed that honokiol acts on GABA_{A} receptors similarly to benzodiazepines and Z-drugs. However, honokiol has been shown to achieve anxiolysis with fewer motor or cognitive side effects than GABA_{A} receptor agonists such as flurazepam and diazepam. It has been shown that honokiol likely has a higher selectivity for different GABA_{A} receptor subtypes and both magnolol and honokiol showed higher efficacy when acting on receptors containing δ subunits. GABA_{A} receptors control ligand-gated Cl^{−} channels that can help increase seizure thresholds through the influx of chloride anions. Honokiol may also affect the synthesis of GABA. In a study where mice received seven daily injections of honokiol, researchers observed a mild increase in hippocampal levels of glutamate decarboxylase (GAD_{67}) an enzyme that catalyzes the synthesis of GABA. However, the increase was within the margin of error for the method used to quantify the protein.

===== Ca^{2+} inhibition =====
A high concentration of Ca^{2+} induces excitotoxicity which is believed to be the main mechanism behind movement disorders such as ALS, Parkinson's disease, and convulsive disorders like epilepsy. Honokiol disrupts the interfaces post synaptic density protein (PSD95) and neuronal nitric oxide synthase (nNOS). PSD95 and nNOS coupling to the NMDA receptor causes a conformational change responsible for the intracellular influx of Ca^{2+} which could in turn be a pathway for neurotoxicity. Calcium overloading can also cause damage by over-activation of calcium-stimulated enzymes. Honokiol can reduce calcium influx through inhibition of the fMLP, AlF_{4}^{−}, and thapsigargin G-protein pathways.

==== Antiviral activity ====
Honokiol has been shown to inhibit hepatitis C virus (HCV) infection in vitro. It has weak in vitro activity against human immunodeficiency virus (HIV-1).

==== Metabolic activity ====
Honokiol was shown to normalize blood glucose levels and prevent body weight gain in diabetic mice by acting as agonist of PPARgamma.

=== Pharmacokinetics ===
The pharmacokinetics of honokiol have been explored in rats and mice; however, further research must be done in humans. Intravenous delivery of 5–10 mg/kg in rodent models has shown a plasma half-life of around 40–60 minutes while intraperitoneal injections of 250 mg/kg had a plasma half-life around 4–6 hours with maximum plasma concentration occurring between 20 and 30 minutes.

==== Delivery methods ====
Honokiol is most commonly taken orally. There are a number of supplements available containing honokiol. Magnolia tea made from the bark of the tree is also a common delivery method of honokiol. Both Native American and Japanese medicine use tea gargles to treat toothaches and sore throats. Because honokiol is highly hydrophobic it must be dissolved in a lipid for many delivery methods. In many current animal studies the compound is dissolved in a lipid emollient and delivered through intraperitoneal injection. There is ongoing work developing liposomal emulsions for IV delivery.
