= Magnolia glauca =

Magnolia glauca can refer to:

- Magnolia glauca (Korth.) Pierre, a synonym of Magnolia elegans (Blume) H.Keng
- Magnolia glauca (L.) L., a synonym of Magnolia virginiana L. subsp. virginiana
- Magnolia glauca Thunb., a synonym of Magnolia obovata Thunb.
