= Araloside A =

Names
- IUPAC name α-L-Arabinofuranosyl-(1→4)-[28-(β-D-glucopyranosyloxy)-28-oxoolean-12-en-3β-yl β-D-glucopyranosiduronic acid]
- Systematic IUPAC name (1^{2}S,1^{3}R,1^{4}R,1^{5}S,3^{2}R,3^{3}R,3^{4}R,3^{5}S,3^{6}S,5^{3}S,5^{4a}R,5^{6a}R,5^{6b}S,5^{8a}S,5^{12a}S,5^{14a}R,5^{14b}R,8^{2}S,8^{3}R,8^{4}S,8^{5}S,8^{6}R)-1^{3},1^{4},3^{3},3^{4},8^{3},8^{4},8^{5}-Heptahydroxy-1^{5},8^{6}-bis(hydroxymethyl)-5^{4},5^{4},5^{6a},5^{6b},5^{11},5^{11},5^{14b}-heptamethyl-6-oxo-5^{2},5^{3},5^{4},5^{4a},5^{5},5^{6},5^{6a},5^{6b},5^{7},5^{8},5^{9},5^{10},5^{11},5^{12},5^{12a},5^{14},5^{14a},5^{14b}-octadecahydro-5^{1}H-2,4,7-trioxa-3(5,2),8(2)-bis(oxana)-1(2)-oxolana-5(3,8a)-picenaoctaphane-3^{6}-carboxylic acid
- Other names Chikusetsusaponin IV

Identifiers
CAS Number	7518-22-1
3D model (JSmol)	Interactive image
ChEBI	CHEBI:67975
ChemSpider	8255035
KEGG	C17540
PubChem CID	10079497
UNII	32BF7Y358G
CompTox Dashboard (EPA)	DTXSID801045681
- InChI: InChI=1S/C47H74O18/c1-42(2)14-16-47(41(59)65-39-33(55)30(52)28(50)23(19-48)61-39)17-15-45(6)21(22(47)18-42)8-9-26-44(5)12-11-27(43(3,4)25(44)10-13-46(26,45)7)62-40-34(56)31(53)35(36(64-40)37(57)58)63-38-32(54)29(51)24(20-49)60-38/h8,22-36,38-40,48-56H,9-20H2,1-7H3,(H,57,58)/t22-,23+,24-,25-,26+,27-,28+,29-,30-,31+,32+,33+,34+,35-,36-,38-,39-,40+,44-,45+,46+,47-/m0/s1 Key: KQSFNXMDCOFFGW-GNDIVNLPSA-N; InChI=1/C47H74O18/c1-42(2)14-16-47(41(59)65-39-33(55)30(52)28(50)23(19-48)61-39)17-15-45(6)21(22(47)18-42)8-9-26-44(5)12-11-27(43(3,4)25(44)10-13-46(26,45)7)62-40-34(56)31(53)35(36(64-40)37(57)58)63-38-32(54)29(51)24(20-49)60-38/h8,22-36,38-40,48-56H,9-20H2,1-7H3,(H,57,58)/t22-,23+,24-,25-,26+,27-,28+,29-,30-,31+,32+,33+,34+,35-,36-,38-,39-,40+,44-,45+,46+,47-/m0/s1 Key: KQSFNXMDCOFFGW-GNDIVNLPBE
- SMILES: C[C@]12CC[C@@H](C([C@@H]1CC[C@@]3([C@@H]2CC=C4[C@]3(CC[C@@]5([C@H]4CC(CC5)(C)C)C(=O)O[C@H]6[C@@H]([C@H]([C@@H]([C@H](O6)CO)O)O)O)C)C)(C)C)O[C@H]7[C@@H]([C@H]([C@@H]([C@H](O7)C(=O)O)O[C@H]8[C@@H]([C@H]([C@@H](O8)CO)O)O)O)O

Properties
Chemical formula	C_{47}H_{74}O_{18}
Molar mass	927.091 g·mol^{−1}
- Except where otherwise noted, data are given for materials in their standard state (at 25 °C [77 °F], 100 kPa). Infobox references

Araloside A is an anti-ulcer isolate of Aralia elata bark.
