= Obovatol =

Names
- Preferred IUPAC name 5-(Prop-2-en-1-yl)-3-[4-(prop-2-en-1-yl)phenoxy]benzene-1,2-diol

Identifiers
CAS Number	83864-78-2
3D model (JSmol)	Interactive image
ChEMBL	ChEMBL491809
ChemSpider	91051
PubChem CID	100771
UNII	H6SZX78NXA
CompTox Dashboard (EPA)	DTXSID601003992
- InChI: InChI=1S/C18H18O3/c1-3-5-13-7-9-15(10-8-13)21-17-12-14(6-4-2)11-16(19)18(17)20/h3-4,7-12,19-20H,1-2,5-6H2 Key: OPGPFZQBCIAFLI-UHFFFAOYSA-N
- SMILES: C=CCC1=CC=C(C=C1)OC2=CC(=CC(=C2O)O)CC=C

Properties
Chemical formula	C_{18}H_{18}O_{3}
Molar mass	282.339 g·mol^{−1}
- Except where otherwise noted, data are given for materials in their standard state (at 25 °C [77 °F], 100 kPa). Infobox references

Obovatol is a biphenolic anti-inflammatory, anxiolytic, and nootropic isolated from the bark of Magnolia obovata. It is a biphenyl lignan.
