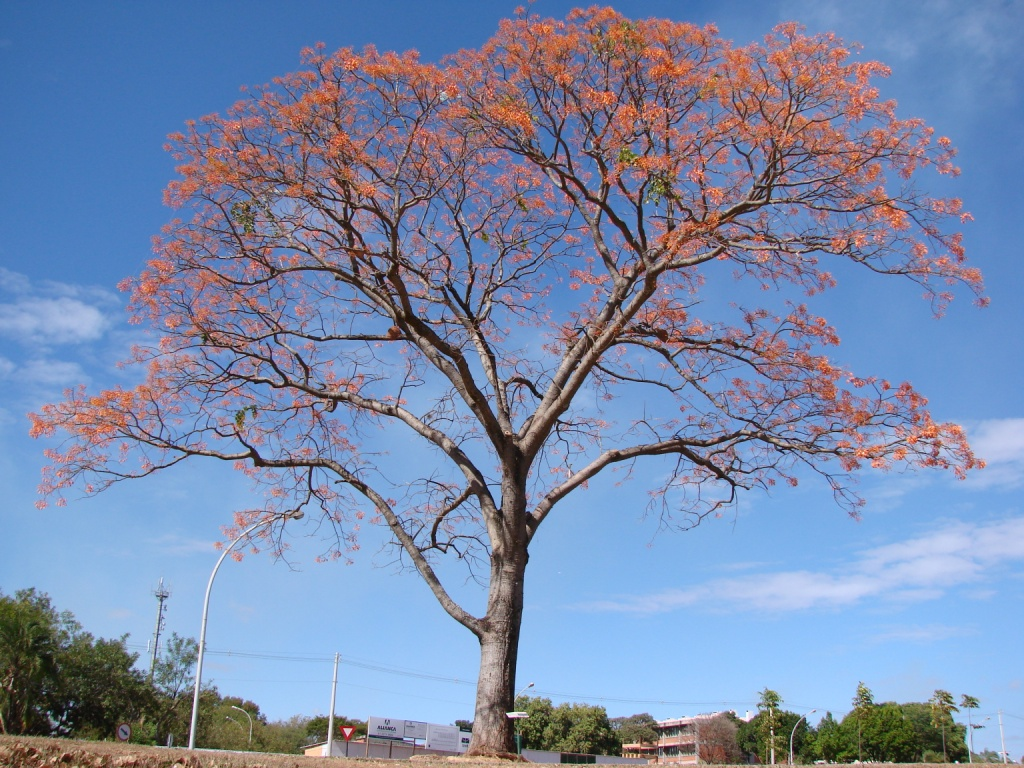

Scientific classification
- Kingdom: Plantae
- Clade: Tracheophytes
- Clade: Angiosperms
- Clade: Eudicots
- Clade: Rosids
- Order: Fabales
- Family: Fabaceae
- Subfamily: Faboideae
- Genus: Erythrina
- Species: E. mulungu

Binomial name
- Erythrina mulungu Mart. ex Benth.

Synonyms
- Corallodendrum mulungu Kuntze; Erythrina flammea Herzog; Erythrina verna Vell.

= Erythrina mulungu =

Mulungu

Species of legume

Erythrina mulungu (Mulungu) is a Brazilian ornamental tree and medicinal plant native to the cerrado and caatinga ecoregions in Brazil and Bolivia, South America.

== Description ==
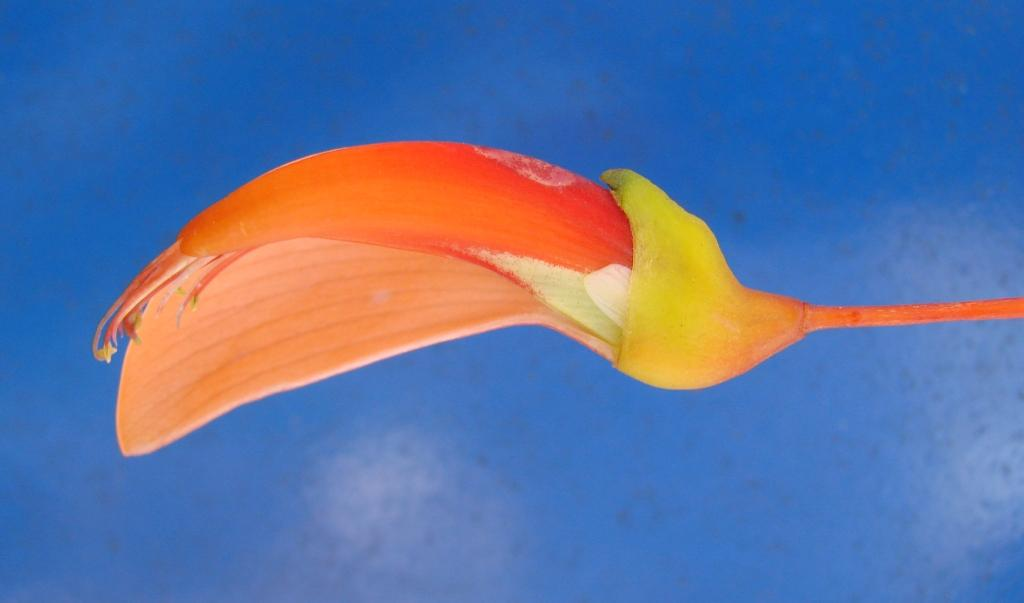
A single flower of Erythrina mulungu

This tree reaches up to 15 meters in height.

== Seeds ==
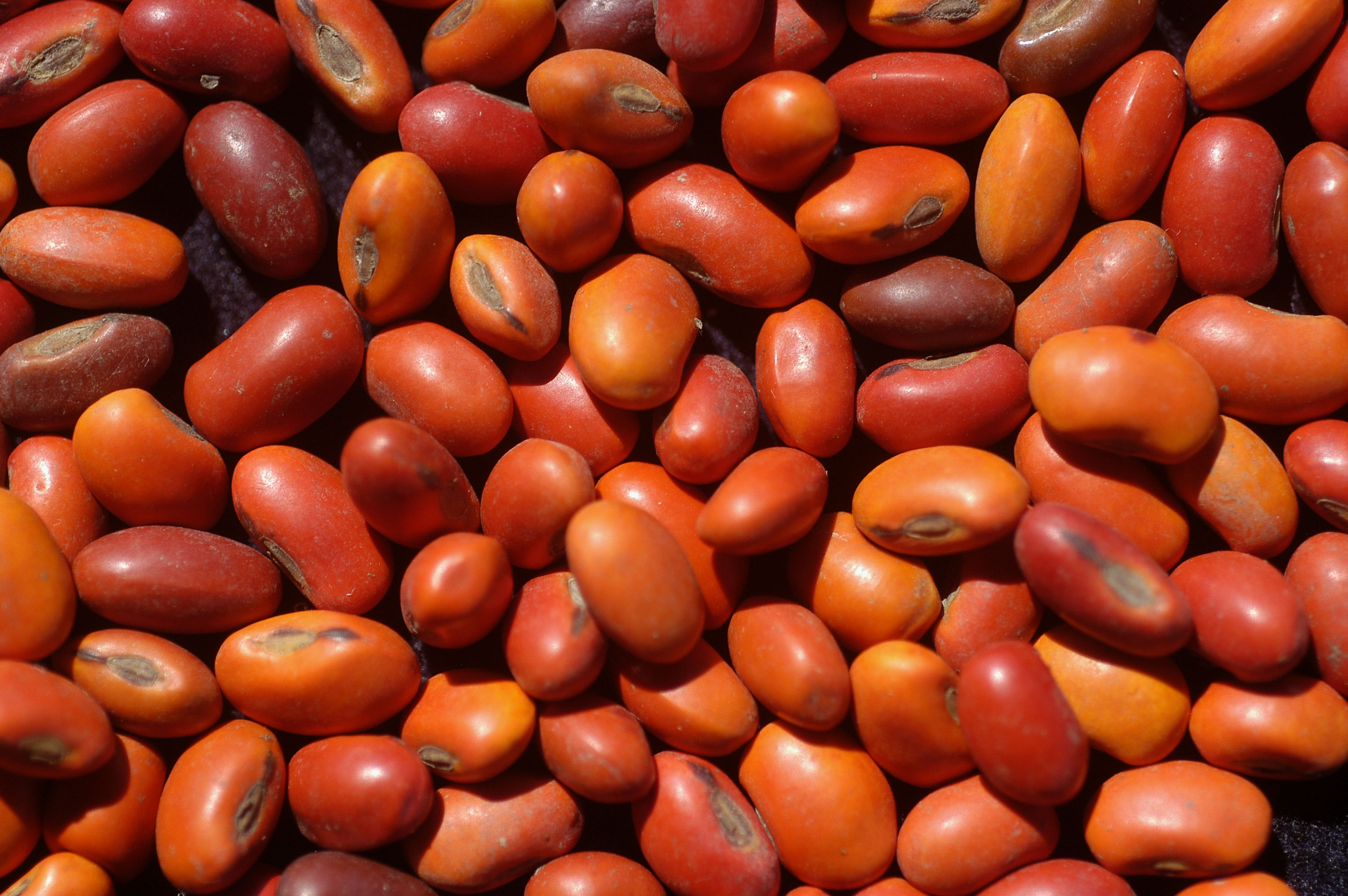
Erythrina mulungu seeds

The red-orange seeds germinate in organo-sandy substrates covered with a layer between 0.5 – 2 cm of the same, being irrigated daily, emerging between 7 and 16 days having high germination rate. Breaking dormancy is not usually necessary. But when it is needed, it is performed through germinative treatments consisting of mechanical scarification of the area opposite to the hilum and immersion in water for 24 hours.

The seeds are considered very toxic. Ingestion should be avoided and there is a danger of death.

== Herbal medicine ==
Several Erythrina tree species are used by indigenous peoples in the Amazon as medicines, insecticides, and fish poisons. Tinctures and decoctions made from the leaves or barks of Mulungu are often used in Brazilian traditional medicine as a sedative, to calm an overexcited nervous system, to lower blood pressure, and for insomnia and depression.

Commercial preparations of Mulungu are available in Brazilian drugstores, but is not very widely known in North America and almost unknown in Europe, appearing mostly as an ingredient in only a few herbal formulas for anxiety or depression.

== Mulungu extract composition ==
Chemical compounds found in Mulungu extract include the tetrahydroisoquinoline alkaloids erythravine and (+)-11α-hydroxy-erythravine.

== See also ==
- List of plants of Caatinga vegetation of Brazil
- List of plants of Cerrado vegetation of Brazil
- Bark isolates
