= Erythravine =

Names
- IUPAC name 15,16-Dimethoxy-1,2,6,7-tetradehydroerythrinan-3β-ol
- Systematic IUPAC name (9bS,11R)-7,8-Dimethoxy-4,5,10,11-tetrahydro-2H-indolo[7a,1-a]isoquinolin-11-ol

Identifiers
CAS Number	19373-79-6
3D model (JSmol)	Interactive image
ChemSpider	9406901
PubChem CID	11231853
UNII	HMX9ZLU64X
CompTox Dashboard (EPA)	DTXSID301027523 DTXSID80726716, DTXSID301027523
- InChI: InChI=1S/C18H21NO3/c1-21-16-9-12-5-7-19-8-6-13-3-4-14(20)11-18(13,19)15(12)10-17(16)22-2/h3-4,6,9-10,14,20H,5,7-8,11H2,1-2H3/t14-,18-/m0/s1 Key: JEBFJSHKHYDVNP-KSSFIOAISA-N
- SMILES: COC1=C(C=C2C(=C1)CCN3[C@]24C[C@H](C=CC4=CC3)O)OC

Properties
Chemical formula	C_{18}H_{21}NO_{3}
Molar mass	299.370 g·mol^{−1}
- Except where otherwise noted, data are given for materials in their standard state (at 25 °C [77 °F], 100 kPa). verify (what is ?) Infobox references

Erythravine is a tetrahydroisoquinoline alkaloid found in the plant Erythrina mulungu and other species of the genus Erythrina.

== Biological activity ==
Some laboratory research has investigated the biological activity of erythravine, but the relevance to effects in humans is unknown.

=== Nicotinic acetylcholine receptor ===
It has been shown to be a potent nicotinic receptor antagonist in animal models with an IC50 of 6μM at the α7 site and 13 nM for the α4β2 receptor.

=== Anxiolytic ===
It appears to have anxiolytic effects in animal models of anxiety. Further studies suggest that the anxiolytic effects are only reproducible with the whole extract of Erythrina mulungu but not with the pure alkaloids.

=== Anticonvulsant ===
Erythravine inhibited seizures evoked by bicuculline, pentylenetetrazole, and kainic acid as well as increasing the latency of seizures induced by NMDA. Treatment with erythravine prevented death in all the animals tested with the four convulsants except a few of those treated with kainic acid.

== See also ==
- Bark isolates
