= Magnolol =

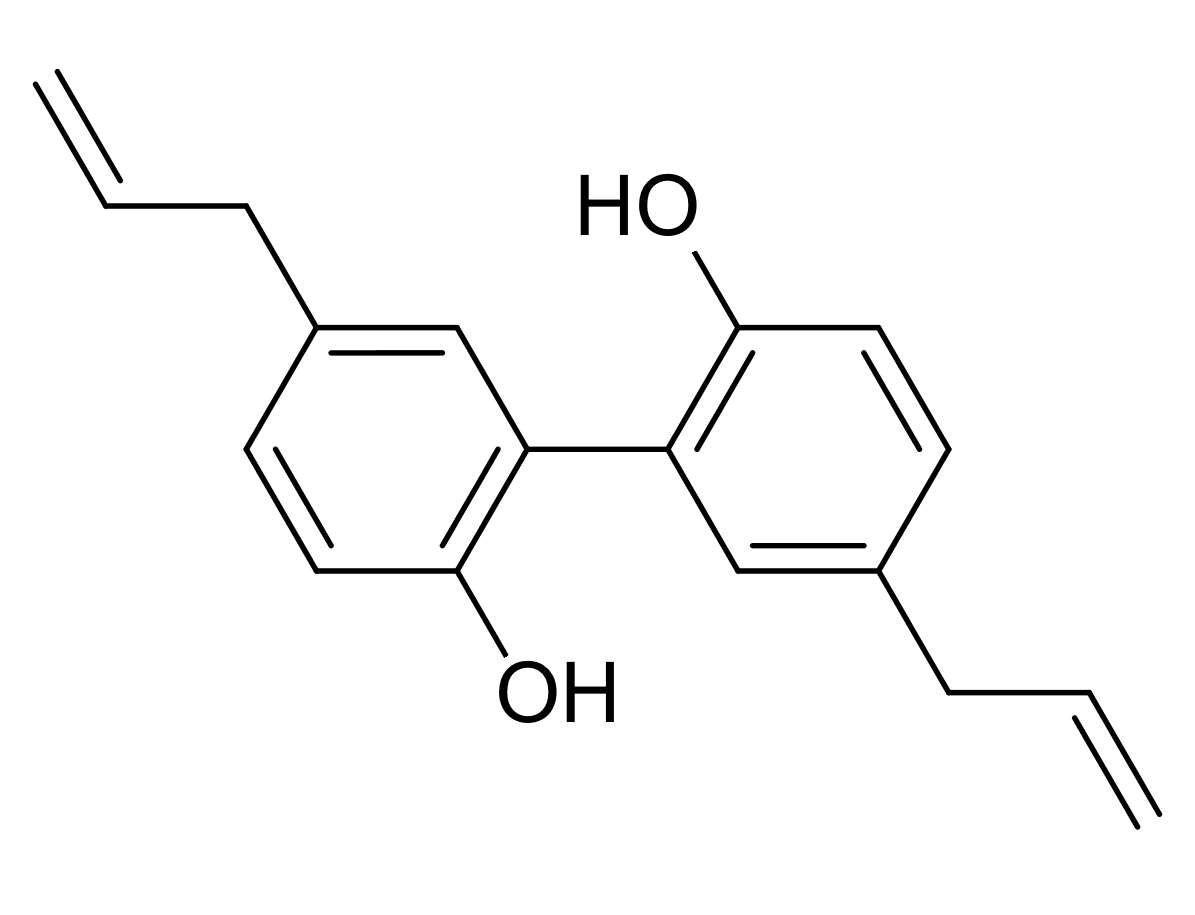

Names
- IUPAC name 3,3′-Neoligna-8,8′-diene-4,4′-diol
- Systematic IUPAC name 5,5′-Di(prop-2-en-1-yl)[1,1′-biphenyl]-2,2′-diol
- Other names Dehydrodichavicol; 5,5'-Diallyl-2,2'-dihydroxybiphenyl; 5,5'-Diallyl-2,2'-biphenyldiol

Identifiers
CAS Number	528-43-8
3D model (JSmol)	Interactive image
ChEMBL	ChEMBL180920
ChemSpider	65251
ECHA InfoCard	100.127.908
KEGG	C10651
PubChem CID	72300
UNII	001E35HGVF
CompTox Dashboard (EPA)	DTXSID0044076
- InChI: InChI=1S/C18H18O2/c1-3-5-13-7-9-17(19)15(11-13)16-12-14(6-4-2)8-10-18(16)20/h3-4,7-12,19-20H,1-2,5-6H2 Key: VVOAZFWZEDHOOU-UHFFFAOYSA-N; InChI=1/C18H18O2/c1-3-5-13-7-9-17(19)15(11-13)16-12-14(6-4-2)8-10-18(16)20/h3-4,7-12,19-20H,1-2,5-6H2 Key: VVOAZFWZEDHOOU-UHFFFAOYAE
- SMILES: C=CCC1=CC(=C(C=C1)O)C2=C(C=CC(=C2)CC=C)O

Properties
Chemical formula	C_{18}H_{18}O_{2}
Molar mass	266.340 g·mol^{−1}
- Except where otherwise noted, data are given for materials in their standard state (at 25 °C [77 °F], 100 kPa). verify (what is ?) Infobox references

Magnolol is an organic compound that is classified as lignan. It is a bioactive compound found in the bark of the Houpu magnolia (Magnolia officinalis) and in M. grandiflora.

Magnolol is a compound that acts on GABA_{A} receptors and functions as an allosteric modulator. It has antifungal properties and demonstrates anti-periodontal disease effects in animal models. In cell cultures, magnolol stimulates osteoblasts and inhibits osteoclasts, indicating potential for anti-osteoporosis treatment. It also binds in a dimeric form to PPARγ, acting as an agonist of this nuclear receptor. Additionally, magnolol may interact with cannabinoid receptors, acting as a partial agonist of CB2 receptors with lower affinity for CB1 receptors.

== Bioactivity ==
It is known to act on the GABA_{A} receptors in rat cells in vitro as well as having antifungal properties. Magnolol has a number of osteoblast-stimulating and osteoclast-inhibiting activities in cell culture and has been suggested as a candidate for screening for anti-osteoporosis activity. It has anti-periodontal disease activity in a rat model. Structural analogues have been studied and found to be strong allosteric modulators of GABA_{A}.

Magnolol is also binding in dimeric mode to PPARγ, acting as an agonist of this nuclear receptor.

Magnolol may interact with cannabinoid receptors, acting as a partial agonist of CB_{2} receptors, with lower affinity for the CB_{1} receptor.
