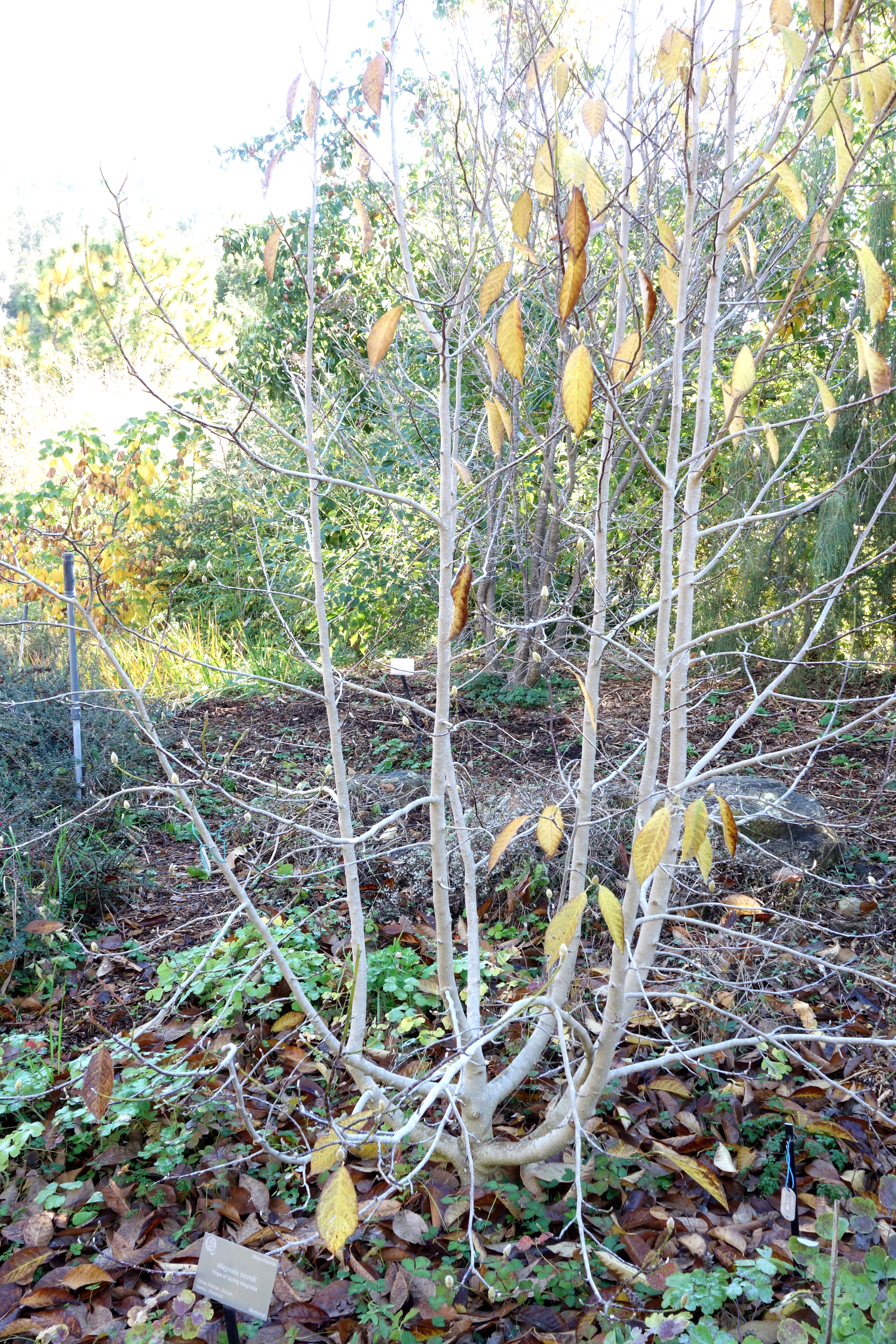

Conservation status
- Least Concern (IUCN 3.1)

Scientific classification
- Kingdom: Plantae
- Clade: Embryophytes
- Clade: Tracheophytes
- Clade: Spermatophytes
- Clade: Angiosperms
- Clade: Magnoliids
- Order: Magnoliales
- Family: Magnoliaceae
- Genus: Magnolia
- Subgenus: Magnolia subg. Yulania
- Section: Magnolia sect. Yulania
- Subsection: Magnolia subsect. Yulania
- Species: M. biondii

Binomial name
- Magnolia biondii Pamp.

Synonyms
- Synonymy: Magnolia aulacosperma Rehder & E.H.Wilson; Magnolia axilliflora T.B.Chao, Y.H.Ren & J.T.Gao; Magnolia axilliflora var. alba T.B.Chao, Y.H.Ren & J.T.Gao; Magnolia axilliflora var. multitepala T.B.Chao, Y.H.Ren & J.T.Gao; Magnolia biondii var. axilliflora T.B.Chao, T.X.Zhang & J.T.Gao; Magnolia biondii var. flava T.B.Chao, J.T.Gao & Y.H.Ren; Magnolia biondii var. latitepala T.B.Chao & J.T.Gao; Magnolia biondii var. multalabastra T.B.Chao, T.X.Zhang & J.T.Gao; Magnolia biondii var. ovata T.B.Chao & T.X.Zhang; Magnolia biondii var. parvialabastra T.B.Chao, J.T.Gao & Y.H.Ren; Magnolia biondii var. planities T.B.Chao & T.Z.Qiao; Magnolia biondii f. purpurascens Y.W.Law & Z.Y.Gao; Magnolia biondii var. purpurascens Ya L.Wang & S.Z.Zhang; Magnolia biondii var. purpurea T.B.Chao & Y.C.Qiao; Magnolia conspicua var. fargesii Finet & Gagnep.; Magnolia denudata var. fargesii (Finet & Gagnep.) Pamp.; Magnolia fargesii (Finet & Gagnep.) W.C.Cheng; Magnolia funiushanensis T.B.Chao, J.T.Gao & Y.H.Ren; Magnolia funiushanensis var. purpurea T.B.Chao & J.T.Gao; Magnolia henanensis B.Y.Ding & T.B.Chao; Magnolia × pilocarpa var. ellipticifolia (D.L.Fu, T.B.Chao & J.Zhao) C.B.Callaghan & Png; Yulania biondii (Pamp.) D.L.Fu; Yulania biondii var. angustitepala D.L.Fu, T.B.Chao & D.W.Zhao; Yulania biondii var. purpurascens Sima & Hong Yu; Yulania × pilocarpa var. ellipticifolia D.L.Fu, T.B.Chao & J.Zhao

= Magnolia biondii =

Species of tree

Magnolia biondii, or Biondi's magnolia, is a deciduous tree that flowers in late winter to early spring before leaf growth. Its early flowering nature gives it the name of the Hope for Spring Flower. It is endemic to China.

M. biondii is a member of the family Magnoliaceae, which consists of more than 210 species. It is widely found in Northern China. It produces small white flowers every few years. Flower buds and petals of the plant are used to alleviate nasal obstruction and coughing in some parts of China.

== Distribution ==
Magnolia biondii is widely distributed in China. It is commonly found in Gansu, Henan, Hubei, Shaanxi, Sichuan provinces. It is usually found in forests in the mountains.

== Habitat and ecology ==
Magnolia biondii is a deciduous tree that grows mainly in temperate forests in the mountains. It has a broadly conical to spreading habit.

== Morphology of leaf ==
Magnolia biondii can grow up to 12 m (40 ft). Its bark has a pale grey, smooth appearance. It produces simple leaf type with ovate shape. In general, leaf size varies and can be up to 20 cm (8 in), long and 10 cm (4 in), across. In addition, they are taper-pointed at the tip and wedge-shaped at the base with a short petiole of up to 2 cm (3/4 in). Furthermore, leaves are arranged in an alternative pattern. Leaves have pinnate venation. Moreover, stamens and carpels are spirally arranged.

== Flowers and fruit ==
Flowers of Magnolia biondii are small and white and have strong fragrance associated to them. They can grow up to 8 cm (3 1/4 in). Flower parts are in sets of threes. In general, flowers have six petals and three sepals. More specifically, the petals are pink at the base and white at the top. Furthermore, flowers have cone-shaped receptacles that bear spirally arranged carpels from which styles emerge.

Stamens are cream-white in color. In addition, flowers take several years to appear. Because of the small size and long growth period, Magnolia biondii is seldom used for ornamental purposes. Magnolia biondii produce aggregate fruits that consist of numerous separate carpels of one gynoecium. The fruits form in cylindrical cluster and protrude on a stalk. Each cluster can grow up to 14 cm (5 1/2 in) long. Individual fruitlets are red at first, then turn brown upon maturity.

== Usage ==
=== Food ===
Dried flower buds and petals of Magnolia biondii are considered food in some parts of China. Fresh flower buds can be prepared by mixing with vinegar and ginger. Petals can be fried with flour batter coating.

=== Medicinal ===
The dried flower buds of Magnolia biondii are used medicinally in China and Japan. They are used to relieve coughing and nasal obstruction. Pharmacologically, five lignans including pinoresinol dimethyl ether, magnolin, epi-magnolin A, fargesin, and demethoxyaschantin have been attributed to the medicinal effect of Magnolia biondii.

== Similar species ==
Magnolia biondii is closely related to the Japanese Willow-Leaf Magnolia, Magnolia salicifolia, which has aromatic foliage and shoots. Resemblance is also observed in Magnolia dendata. Magnolia biondii is generally distinguished by its smaller size, narrower leaves, and smaller flowers.
