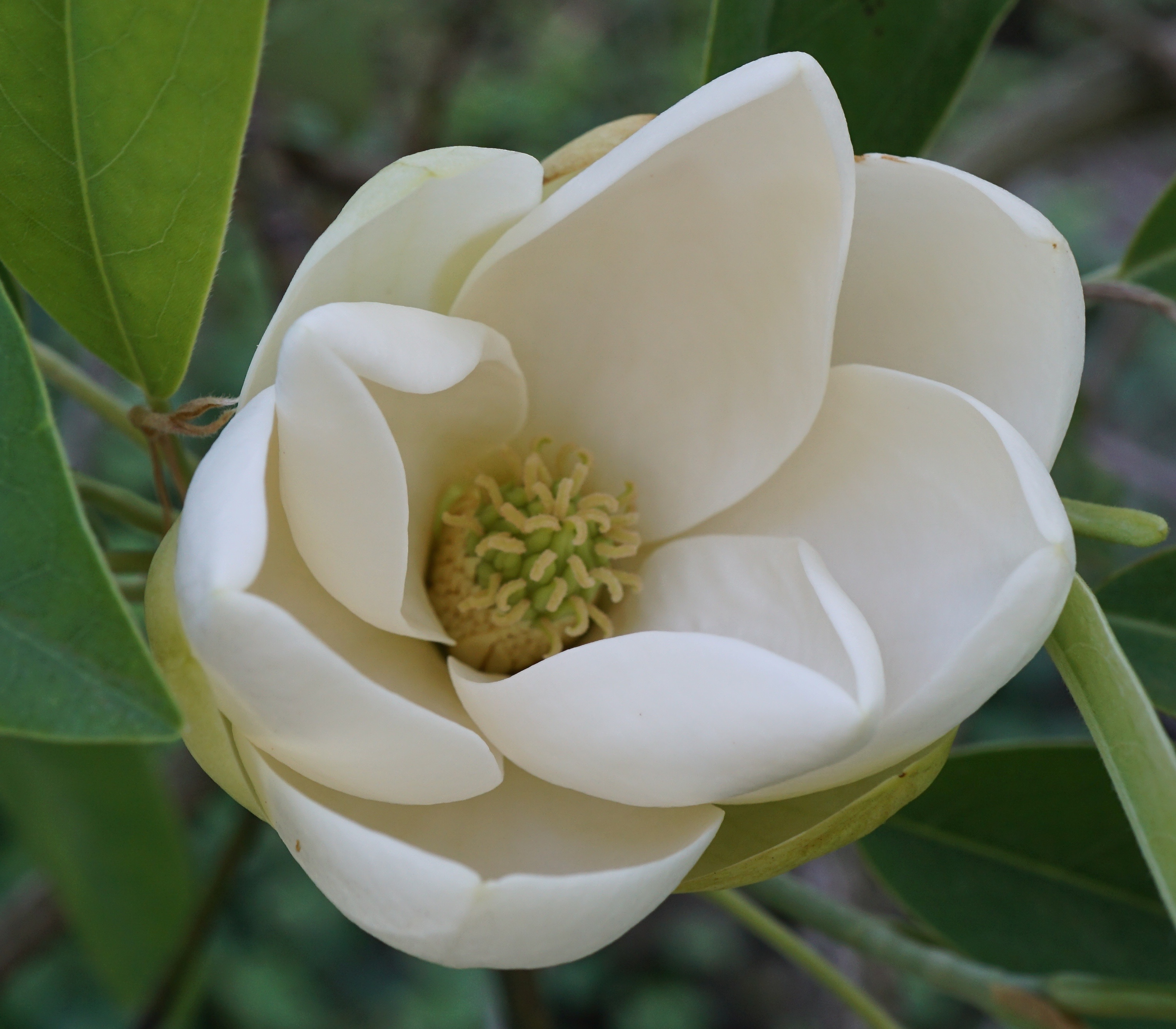
- Magnolia virginiana var. australis flower, Arnold Arboretum of Harvard University, accession #1275-80*A

Conservation status
- Least Concern (IUCN 3.1)

- Secure (NatureServe)

Scientific classification
- Kingdom: Plantae
- Clade: Tracheophytes
- Clade: Angiosperms
- Clade: Magnoliids
- Order: Magnoliales
- Family: Magnoliaceae
- Genus: Magnolia
- Section: Magnolia sect. Magnolia
- Species: M. virginiana

Binomial name
- Magnolia virginiana L.
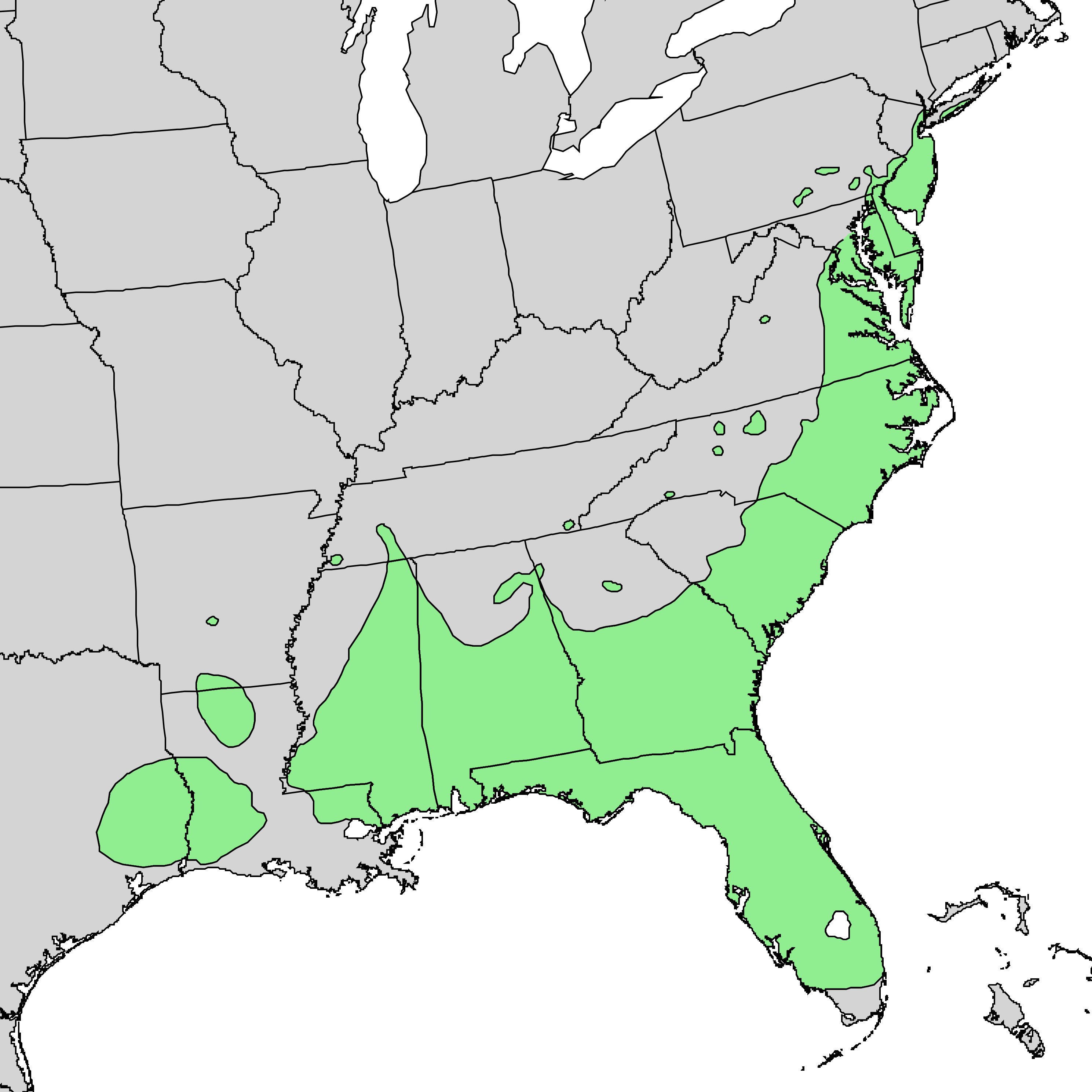

= Magnolia virginiana =

Sweetbay magnolia

Species of tree in the magnolia family

Magnolia virginiana, most commonly known as sweetbay magnolia, or merely sweetbay (also laurel magnolia, swampbay, swamp magnolia, white bay, or beaver tree), is a member of the magnolia family, Magnoliaceae. It was the first magnolia to be scientifically described under modern rules of botanical nomenclature, and is the type species of the genus Magnolia; as Magnolia is also the type genus of all flowering plants (magnoliophytes), this species in a sense typifies all flowering plants. Magnolia virginiana is very flood tolerant, it is also drought tolerant. The species is found in wetlands.

== Taxonomy ==
Magnolia virginiana was one of the many species described by Carl Linnaeus.

== Subdivisions ==
Three subdivisions are accepted.

- Magnolia virginiana var. australis Sarg. – South Carolina to Texas
- Magnolia virginiana subsp. oviedoae Palmarola, M.S.Romanov & A.V.Bobrov – Cuba (Matanzas Province)
- Magnolia virginiana subsp. virginiana – Alabama to Massachusetts

== Description ==
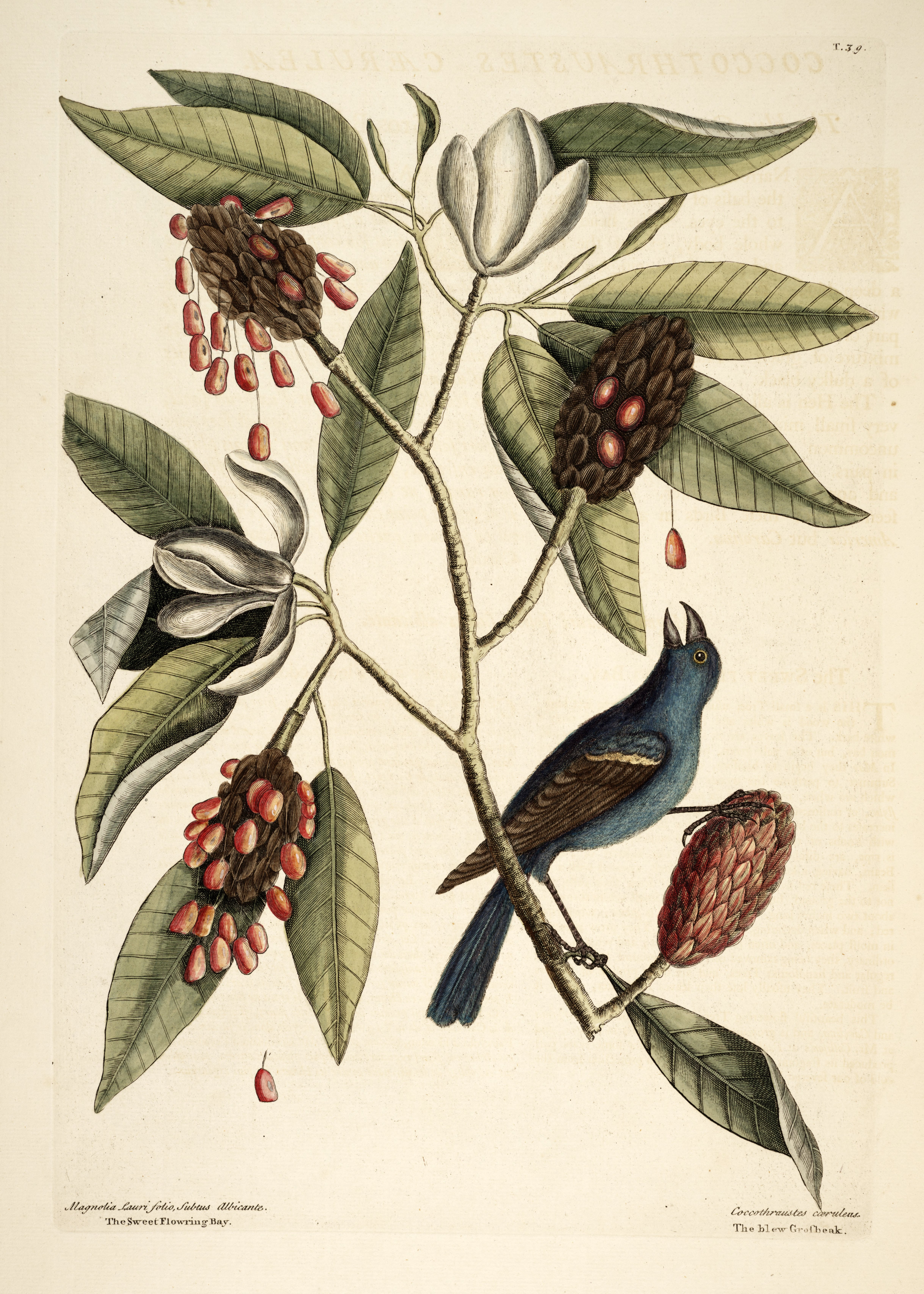
Mark Catesby (1731), Natural History of Carolina etc., plate 39, with Magnolia lauri folio, subtus albicante, the Sweet Bay (Magnolia virginiana) and Coccothraustes coeruleus, the Blue Grosbeak (Passerina caerulea)

Magnolia virginiana is an evergreen or deciduous tree growing up to 30 m (100 ft) tall, native to the lowlands and swamps of the Atlantic coastal plain of the eastern United States, from Florida to Long Island, New York with a disjunct native population found on Cape Ann in northeastern Massachusetts. Subspecies oviedoae is endemic to Matanzas Province of Cuba. Whether it is deciduous or evergreen depends on climate; it is evergreen in areas with milder winters in the south of its range (zone 7 southward), and is semi-evergreen or deciduous further north. The leaves are alternate, simple (not lobed or pinnate), with entire margins, 6–12 cm long, and 3–5 cm wide. The bark is smooth and gray, with the inner bark mildly scented, the scent reminiscent of the bay laurel spice.

The flowers, which appear in late spring or early summer, are creamy white, 8–14 cm diameter, with 6-15 petal-like tepals. The flowers carry a very strong vanilla scent that can sometimes be noticed several hundred yards away. The fruit is a fused aggregate of follicles, 3–5 cm long, pinkish-red when mature (in early fall), with the follicles splitting open to release the 1 cm long seeds. The seeds are black but covered by a thinly fleshy red coat, which is attractive to some fruit-eating birds; these swallow the seeds, digest the red coating, and disperse the seeds in their droppings.

== Cultivation ==
Magnolia virginiana is often grown as an ornamental tree in gardens, and used in horticultural applications to give an architectural feel to landscape designs. It is an attractive tree for parks and large gardens, grown for its large, conspicuous, scented flowers, for its clean, attractive foliage, and for its fast growth. In warmer areas Magnolia virginiana is valued for its evergreen foliage.

The English botanist and missionary John Banister collected Magnolia virginiana in the southeastern United States in 1678 and sent it to England, where it flowered for Bishop Henry Compton. This species was the first magnolia to be cultivated in England, although it was soon overshadowed by the evergreen, larger-flowered southern magnolia (M. grandiflora).

The sweetbay magnolia has been hybridized horticulturally with a number of species within subgenus Magnolia. These species include M. globosa, M. grandiflora, M. insignis, M. macrophylla, M. obovata, M. sieboldii and M. tripetala. Some of these hybrids have been given cultivar names and registered by the Magnolia Society.

== Chemistry ==
Flowers contain the neolignans 3,5′-diallyl-2′,4-dihydroxybiphenyl, 4,4′-diallyl-2,3′-dihydroxybiphenyl ether, 5,5′-diallyl-2,2′-dihydroxybiphenyl and 3,5′-diallyl-2′-hydroxy-4-methoxybiphenyl.

== Gallery ==
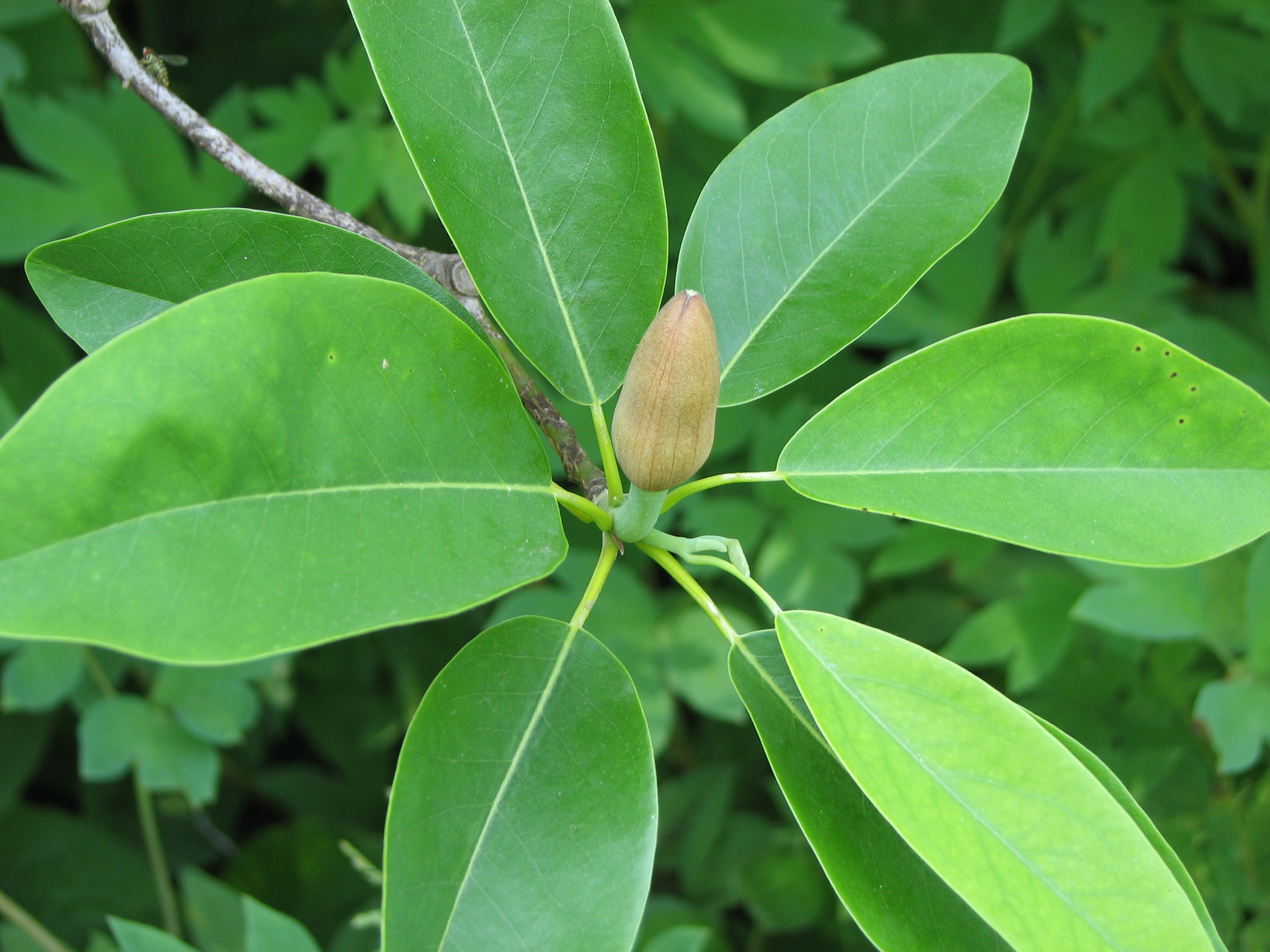
Unopened flower bud

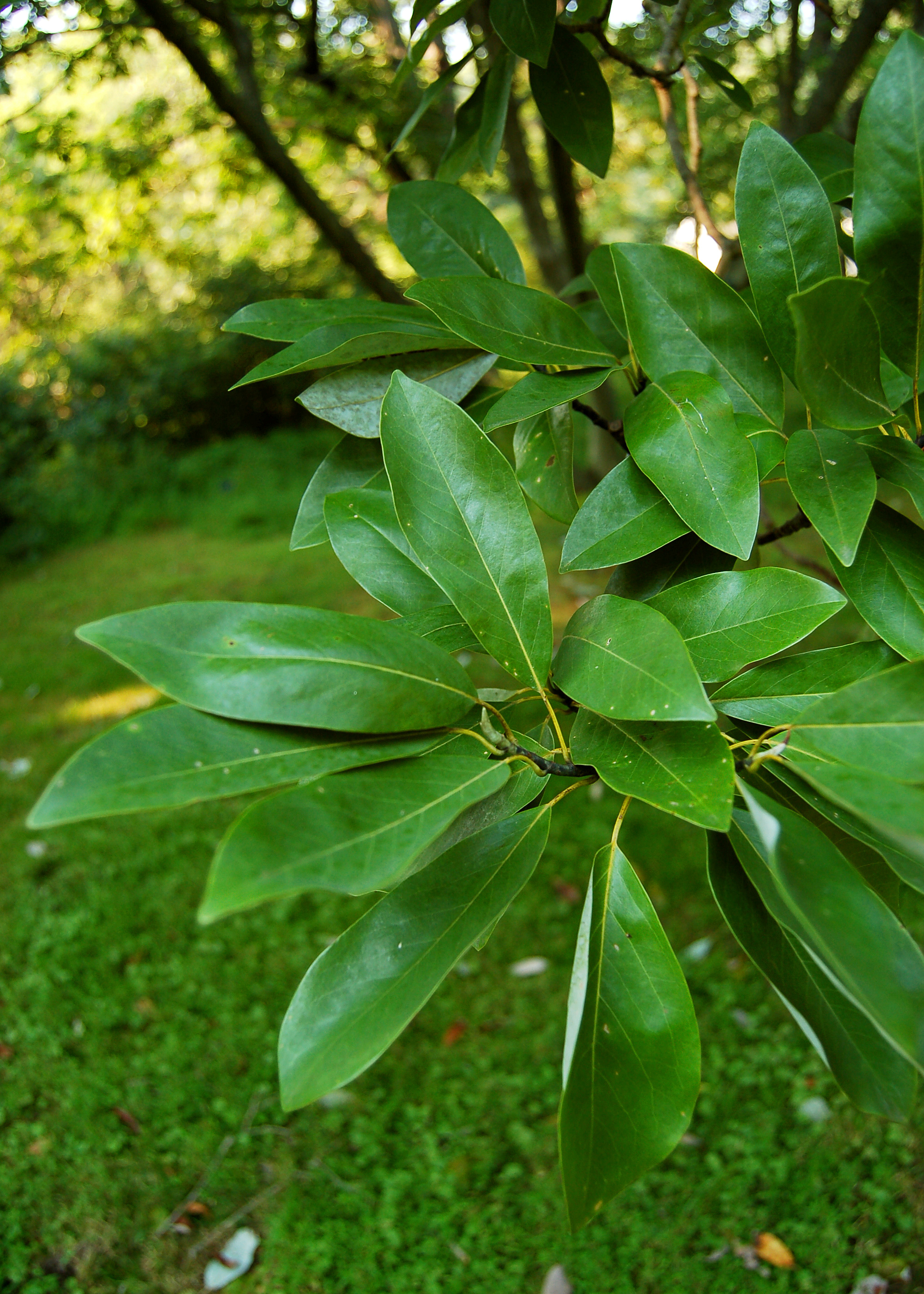
Leaves

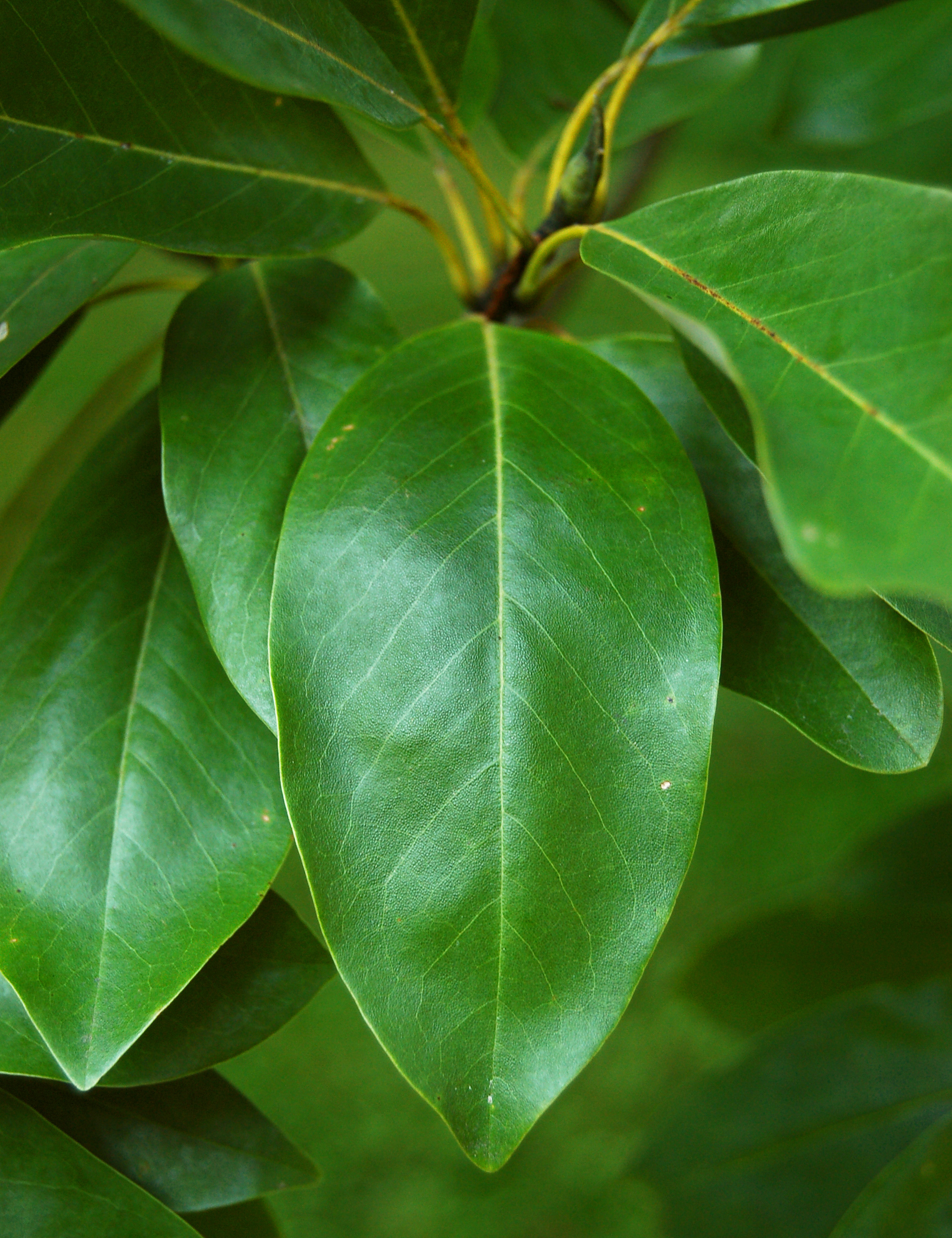
Leaf closeup

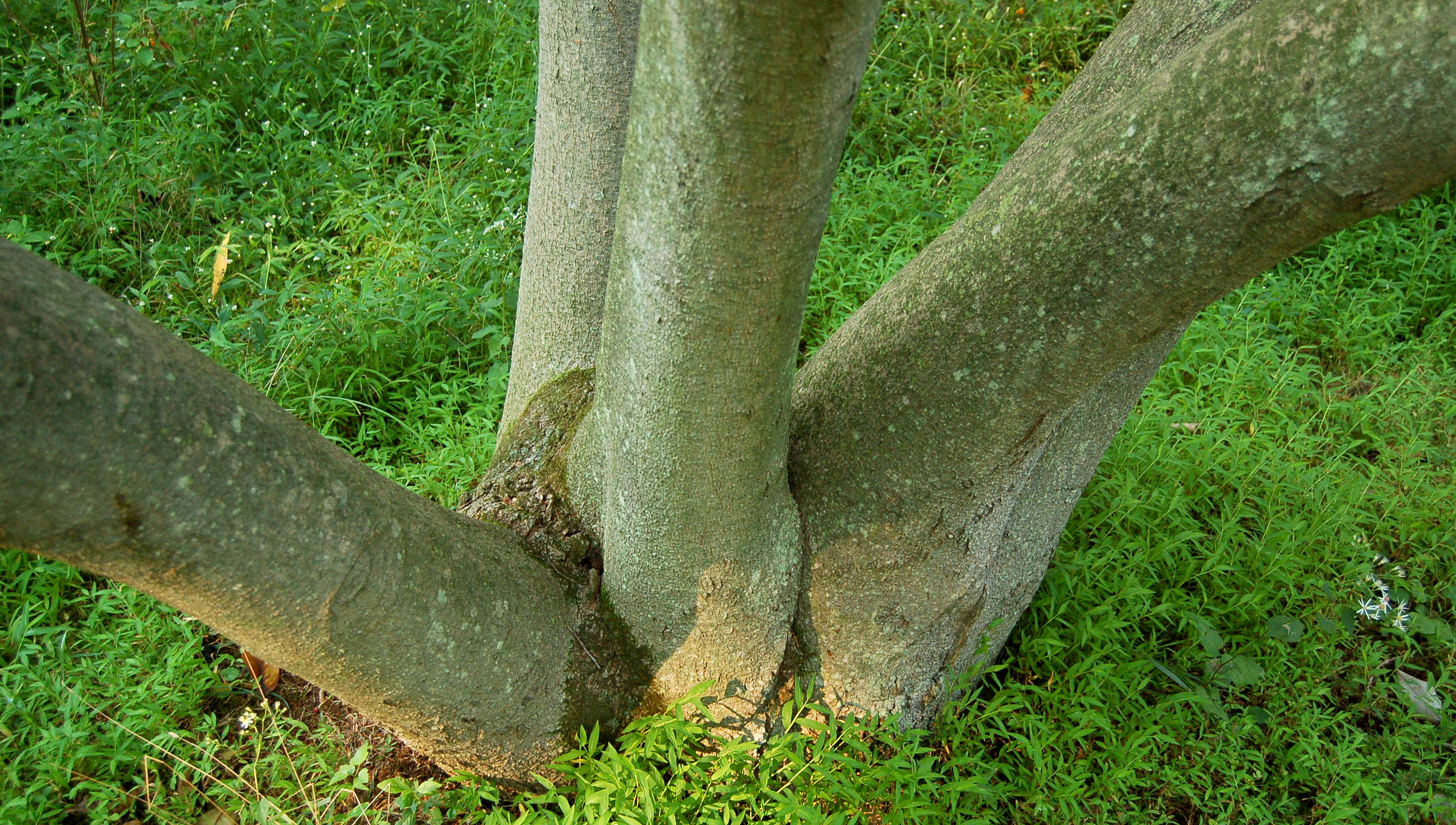
Base of the tree's trunk

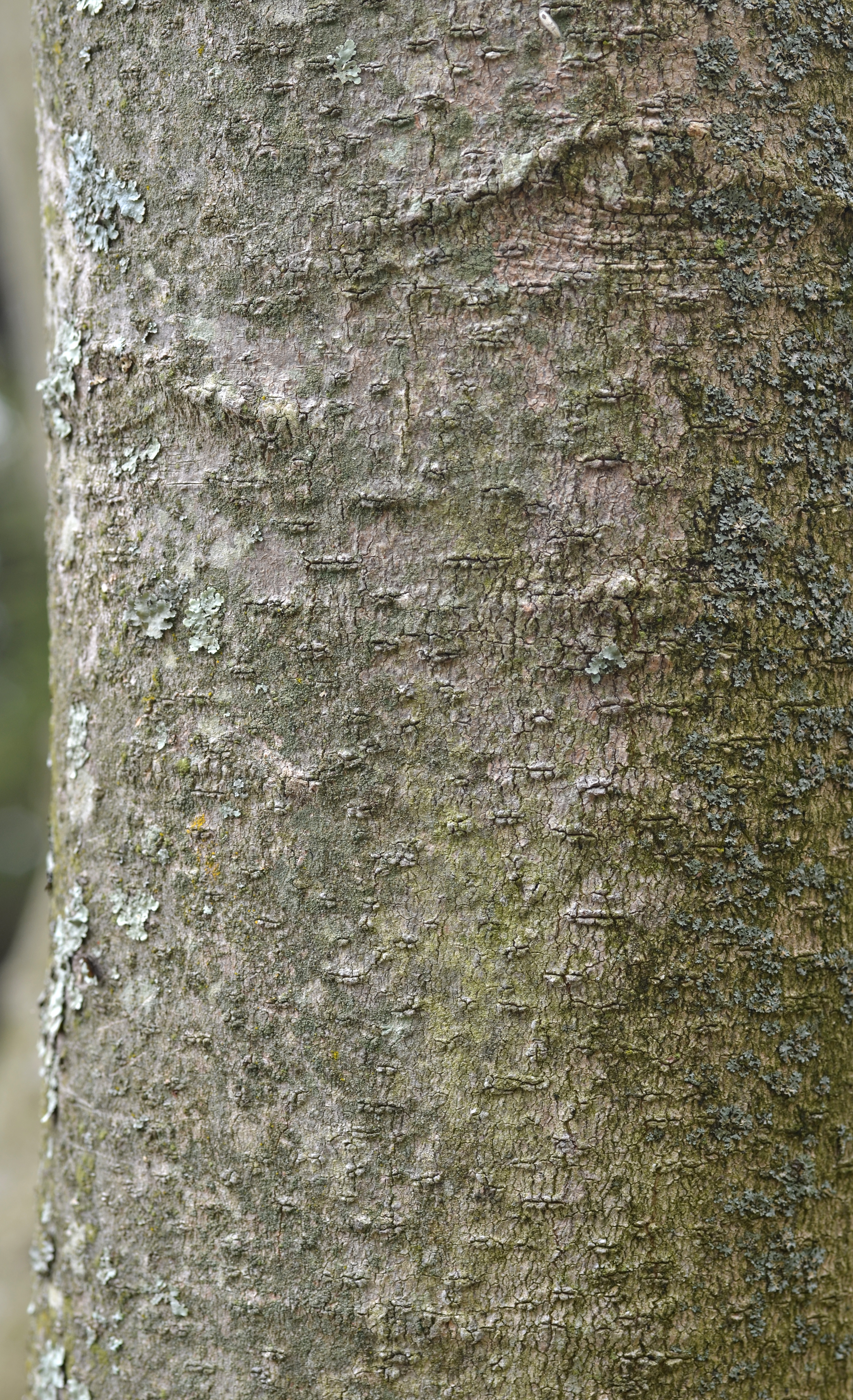
Closeup of the tree's bark

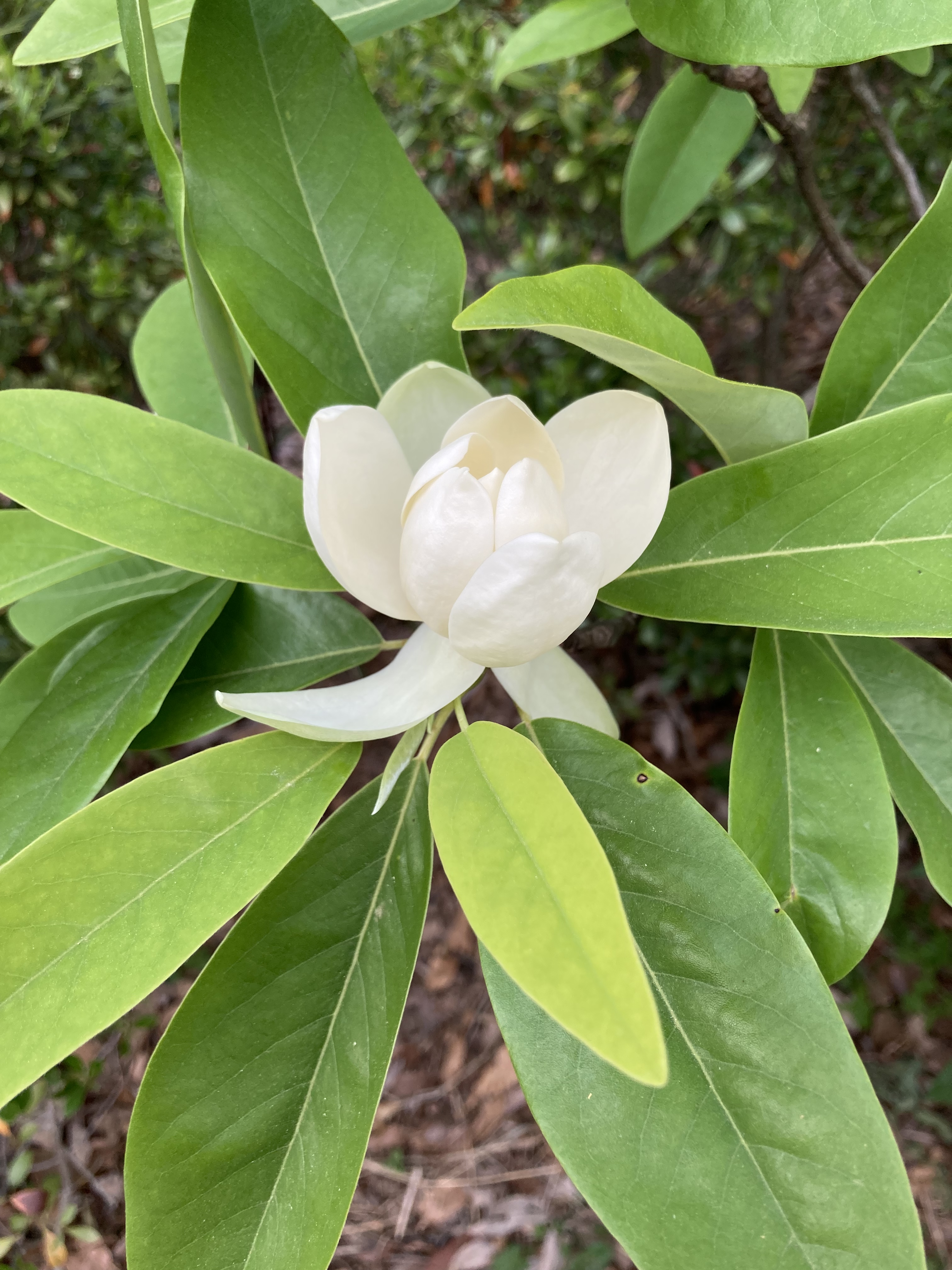
Sweet Bay Magnolia flower just before opening

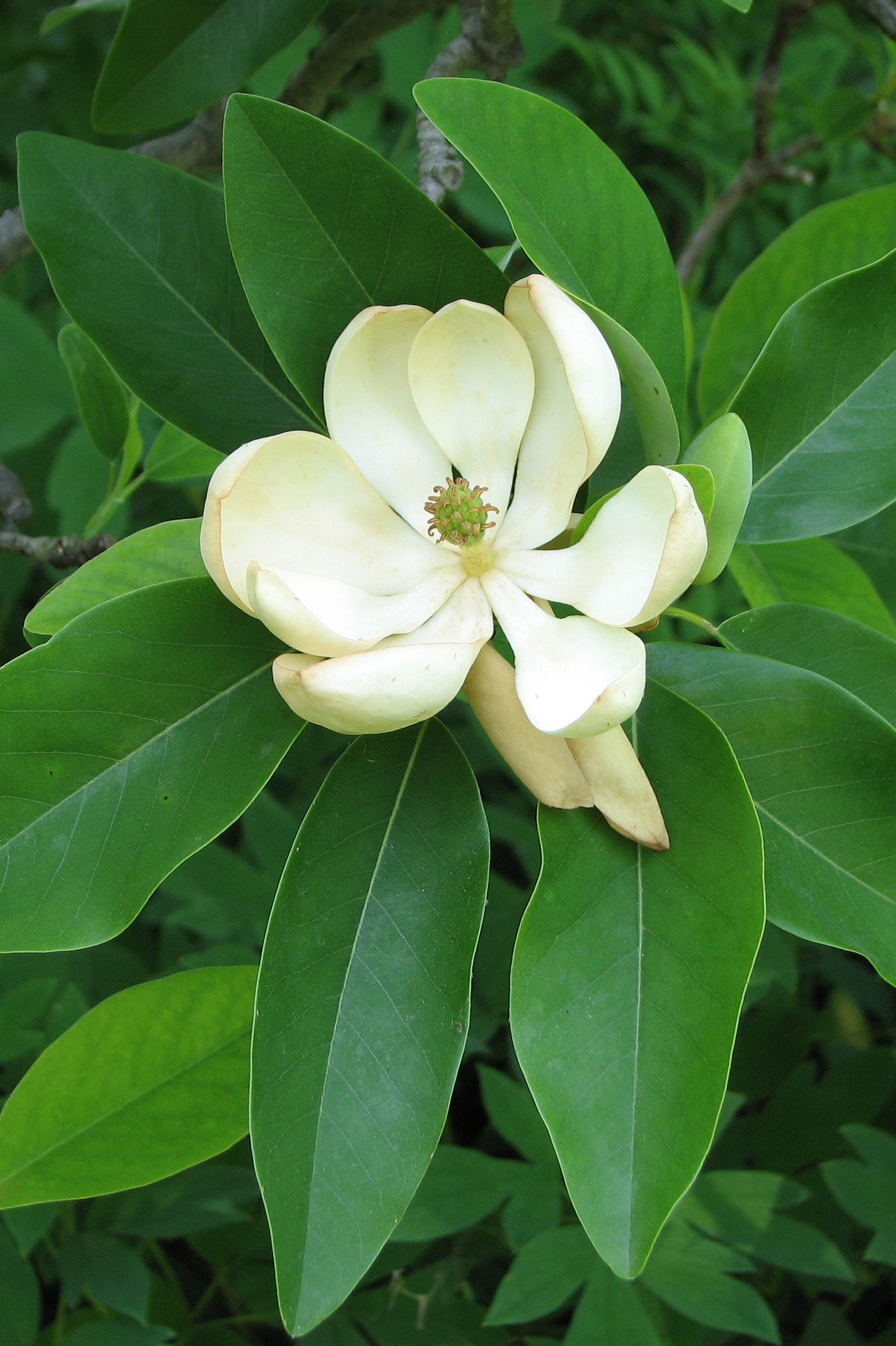
Flower

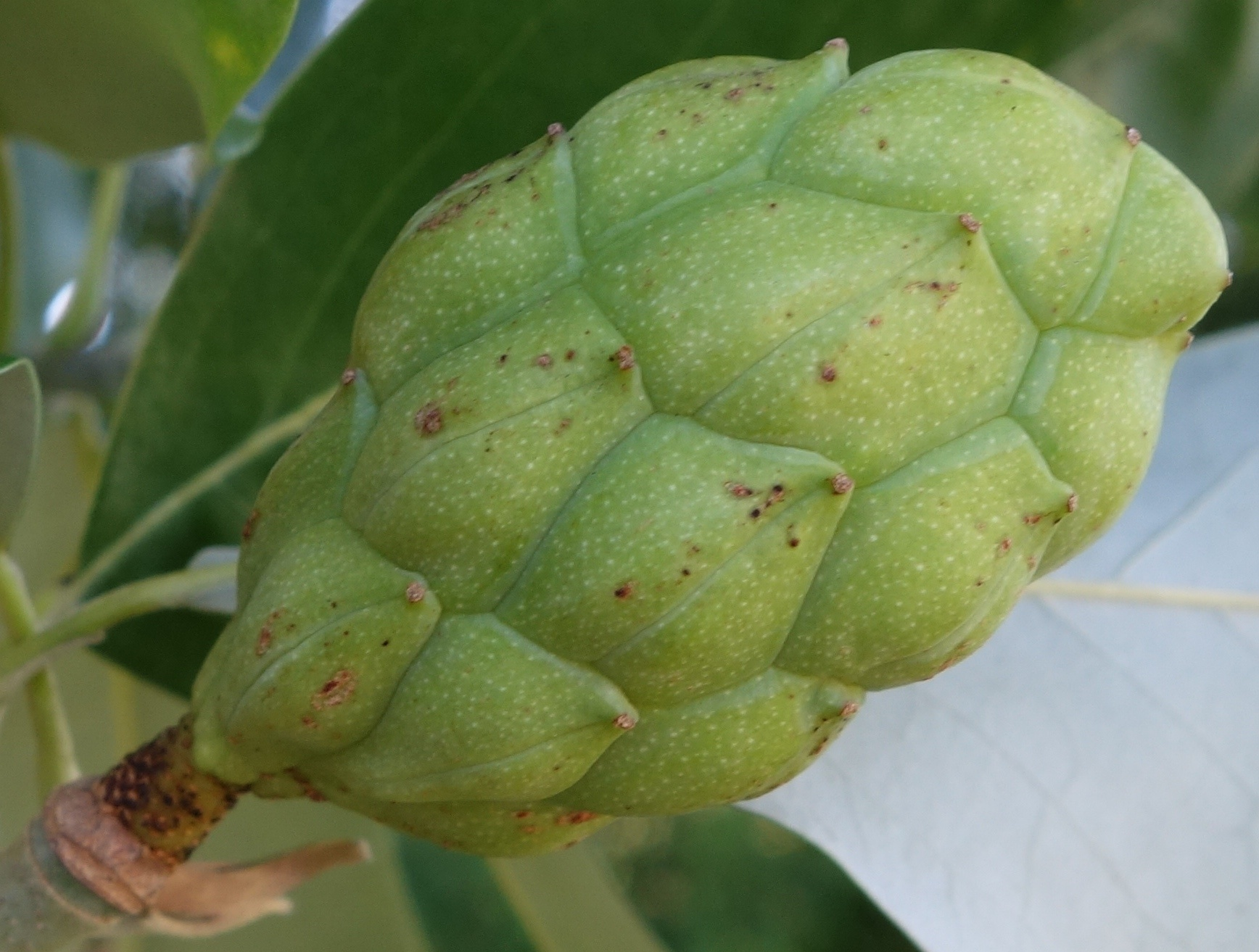
Immature fruit

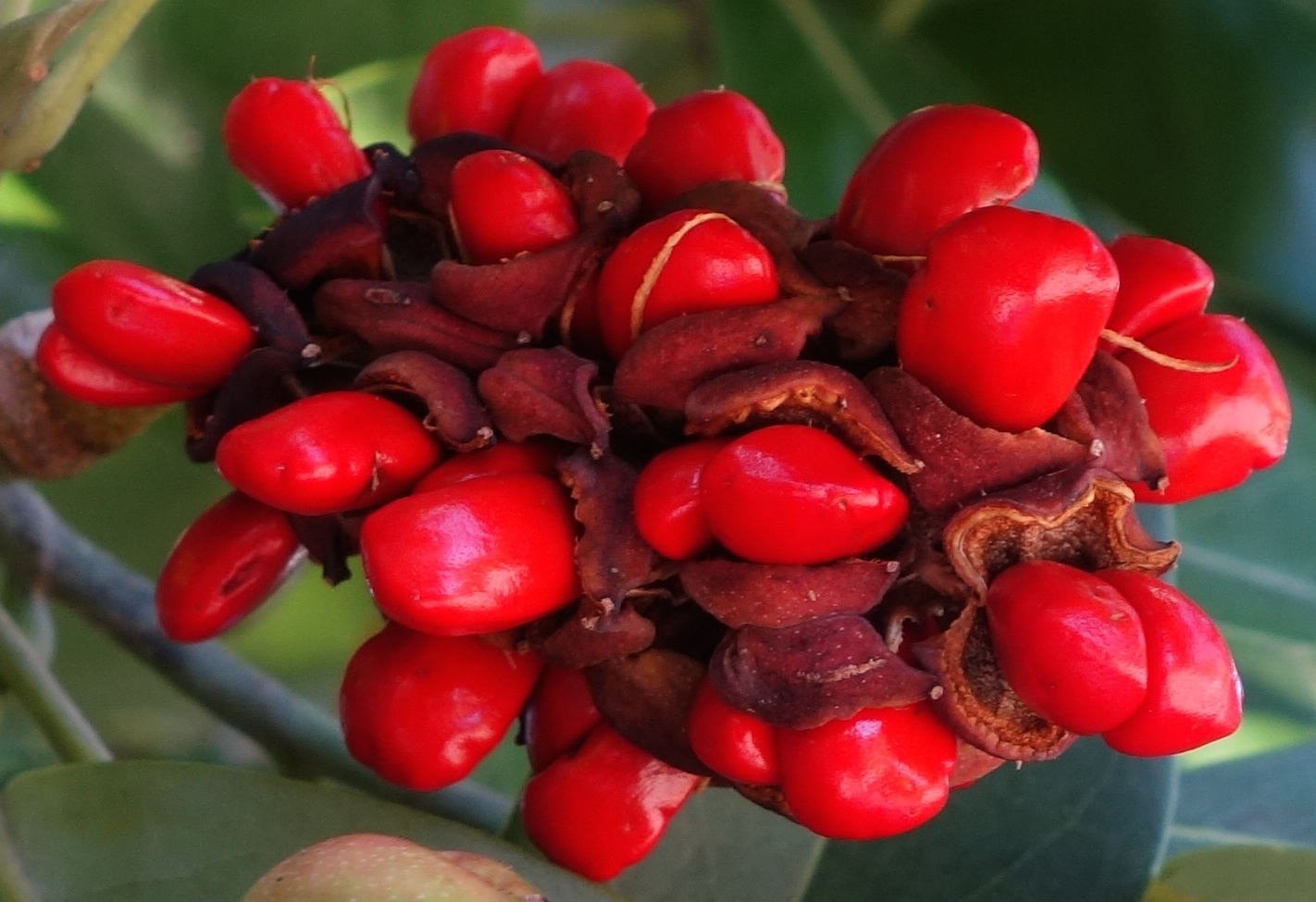
Mature fruit

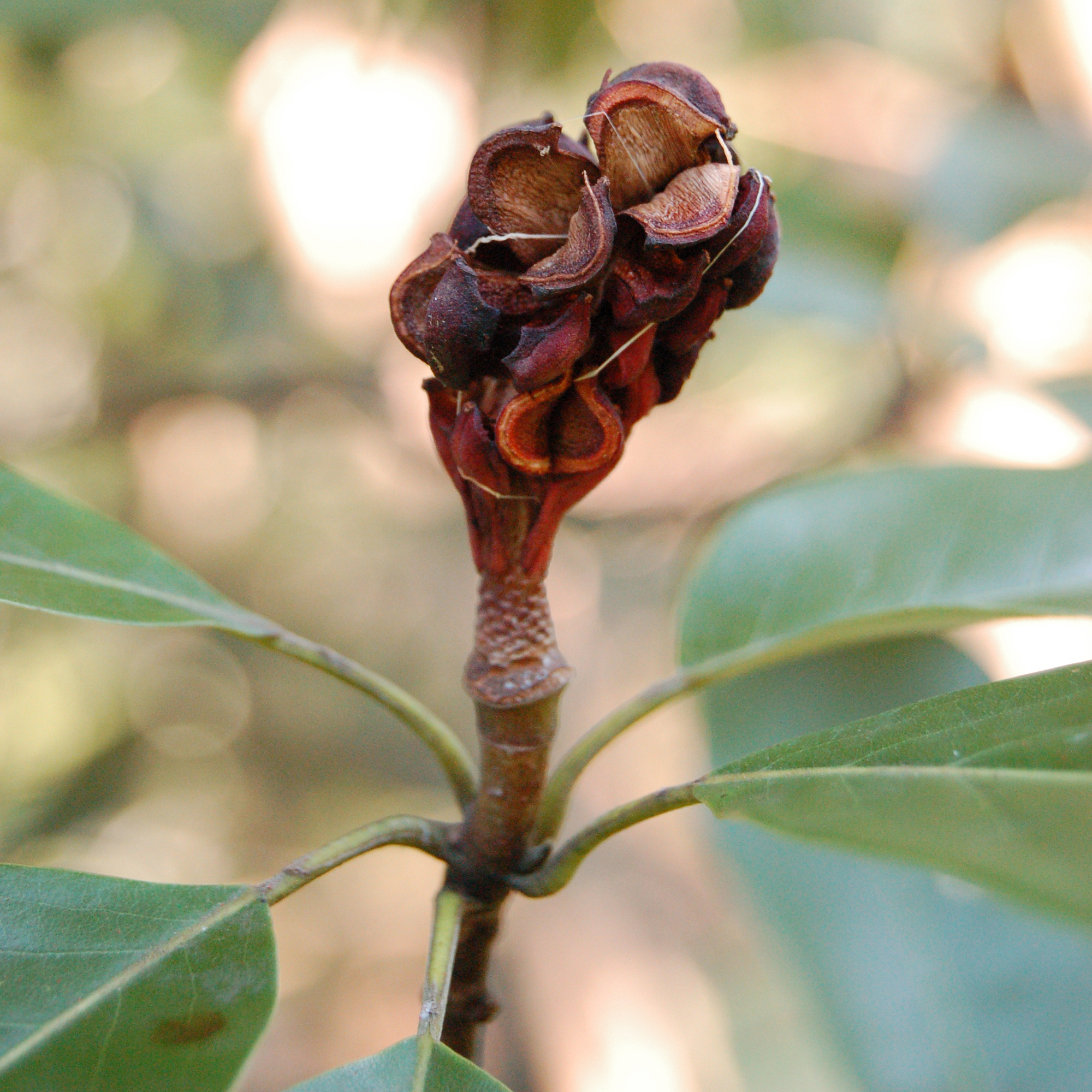
Dried berry cluster
