= 4-O-Methylhonokiol =

Names
- Preferred IUPAC name 4′-Methoxy-3′,5-di(prop-2-en-1-yl)[1,1′-biphenyl]-2-ol
- Other names 3,5′-Diallyl-2′-hydroxy-4-methoxybiphenyl

Identifiers
CAS Number	68592-15-4
3D model (JSmol)	Interactive image
ChemSpider	136692
PubChem CID	155160
UNII	TUH6B83HJW
CompTox Dashboard (EPA)	DTXSID50218693
- InChI: InChI=1S/C19H20O2/c1-4-6-14-8-10-18(20)17(12-14)15-9-11-19(21-3)16(13-15)7-5-2/h4-5,8-13,20H,1-2,6-7H2,3H3 Key: OQFHJKZVOALSPV-UHFFFAOYSA-N; InChI=1/C19H20O2/c1-4-6-14-8-10-18(20)17(12-14)15-9-11-19(21-3)16(13-15)7-5-2/h4-5,8-13,20H,1-2,6-7H2,3H3 Key: OQFHJKZVOALSPV-UHFFFAOYAP
- SMILES: COC1=C(C=C(C=C1)C2=C(C=CC(=C2)CC=C)O)CC=C

Properties
Chemical formula	C_{19}H_{20}O_{2}
Molar mass	280.367 g·mol^{−1}
- Except where otherwise noted, data are given for materials in their standard state (at 25 °C [77 °F], 100 kPa). Infobox references

4-O-Methylhonokiol is a neolignan, a type of phenolic compound. It is found in the bark of Magnolia grandiflora and in M. virginiana flowers. Recent studies shows the presence of 4-O-Methylhonokiol in a few other Magnolia species such as; Magnolia officinalis, Magnolia obovata, and Magnolia garrettii.

4-O-Methylhonokiol is a CB_{2} receptor ligand (K_{i} = 50 nM), showing inverse agonism and partial agonism via different pathways (cAMP and Ca^{2+}), which potently inhibits osteoclastogenesis. 4-O-Methylhonokiol further attenuates memory impairment in presenilin 2 mutant mice through reduction of oxidative damage and inactivation of astrocytes and the ERK pathway. The different neuroprotective effects reported in rodent models may be mediated via CB_{2} receptors. 4-O-Methylhonokiol activates CB_{2} receptors and also inhibits the oxygenation of the major endocannabinoid 2-AG via COX-2 in a substrate-selective manner, thus leading to potential synergistic effects at CB receptors. The same study also provided data that 4-O-methylhonokiol can readily pass the blood–brain barrier.
