= Bark isolate =

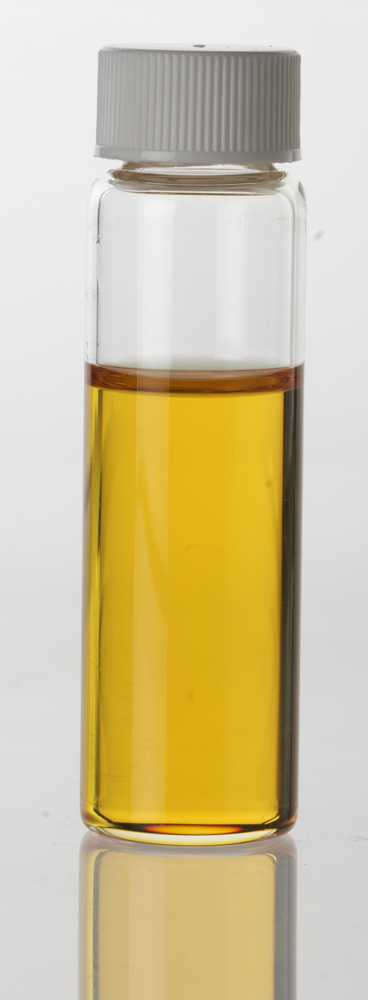
Cinnamon

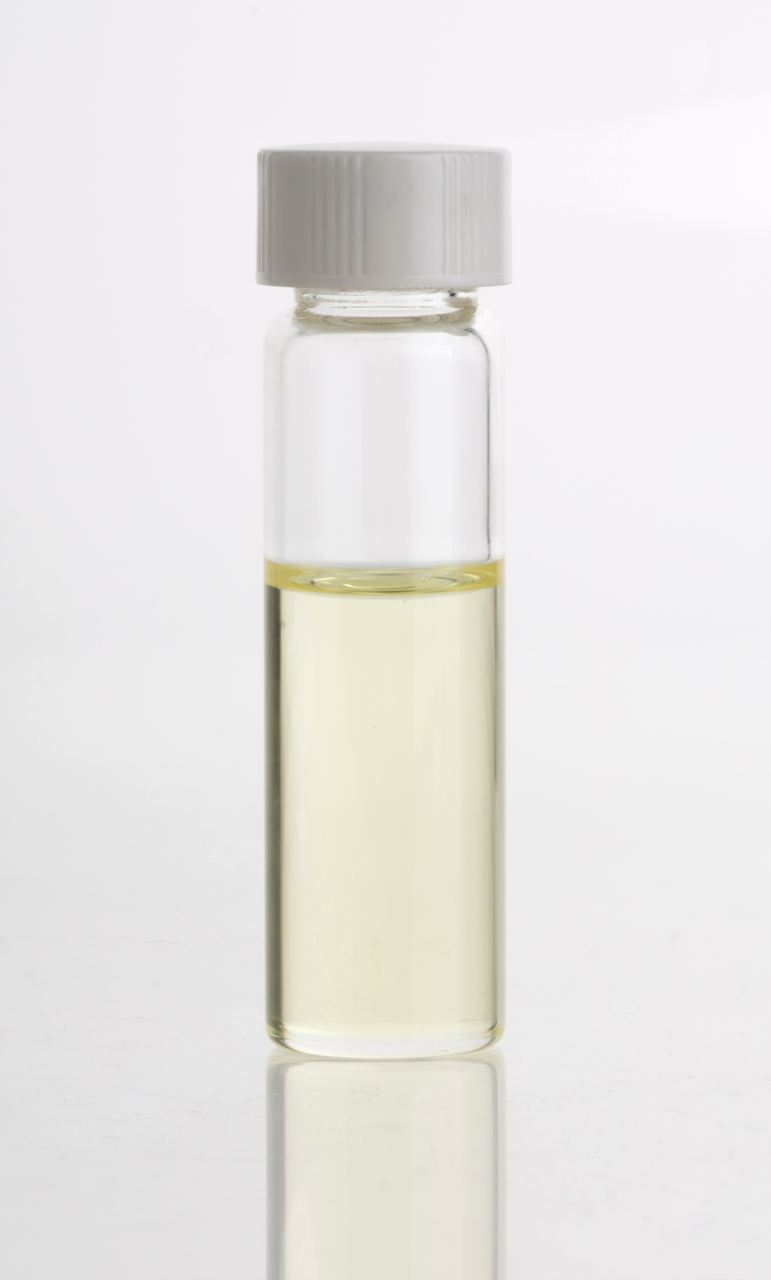
Sandalwood

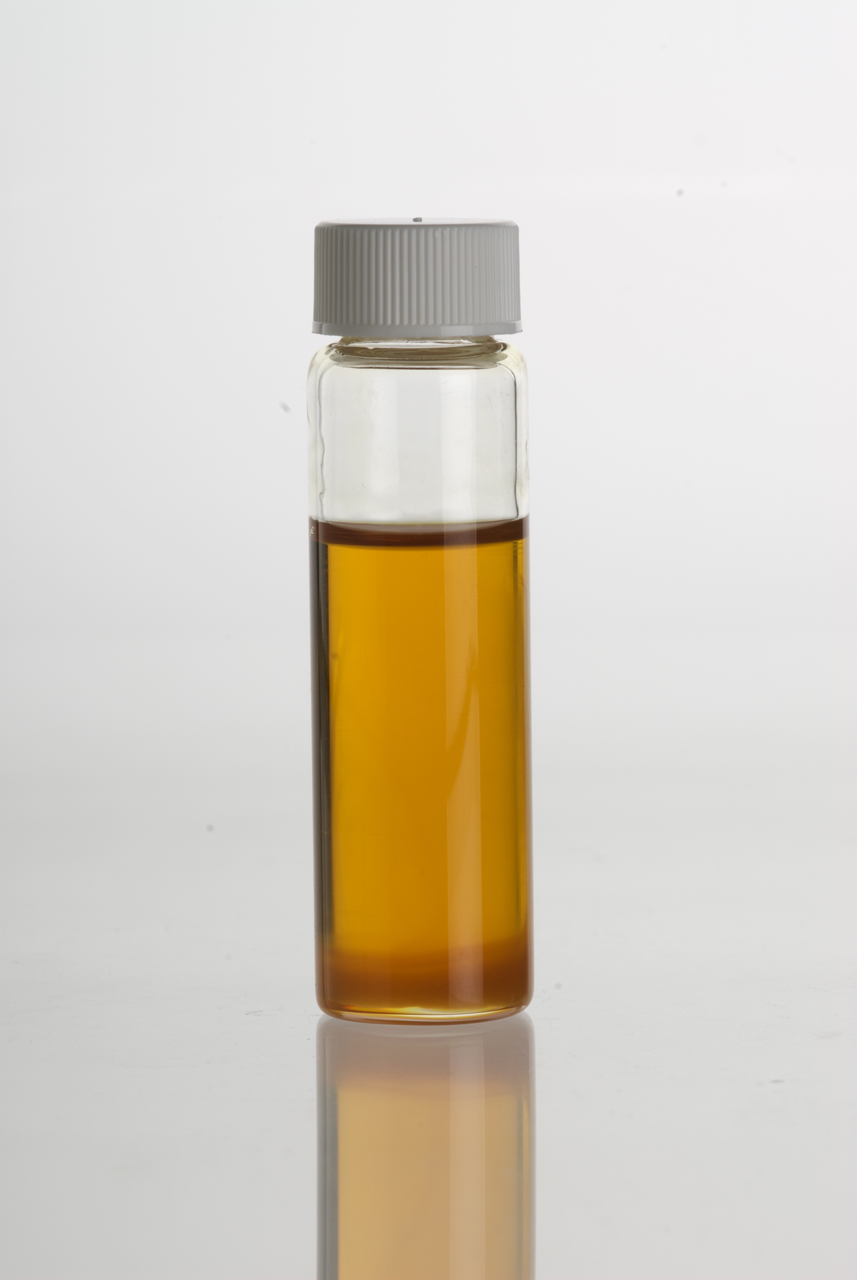
Myrrh

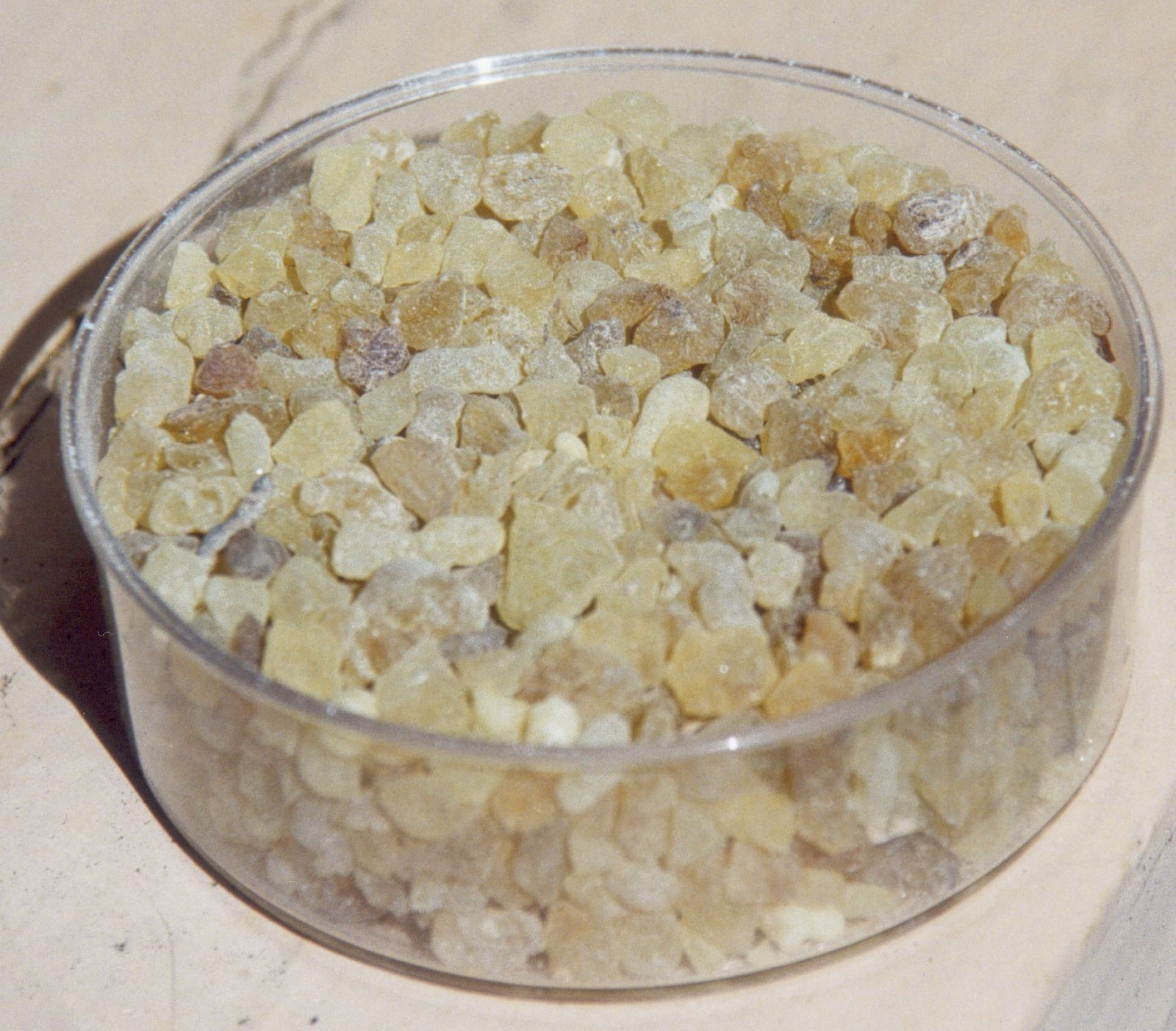
Frankincense

Bark isolates are chemicals which have been extracted from bark. Prominent medical examples are salicylic acid (active metabolite of aspirin) and paclitaxel (Taxol). The pharmacology of bark isolates is an ongoing topic of medical research.

Isolate	Bark source	Researched activity
Paclitaxel, taxanes	Taxus	chemotherapeutic
Paeonol	Paeonia suffruticosa	various
Honokiol, 4-O-methylhonokiol, magnolol, obovatol	Magnolia	neurotrophic & anti-inflammatory
Salicylic acid	Salix alba	antipyretic, analgesic
Yohimbine, corynanthine, ajmalicine, rauwolscine	west African evergreen	MAOI, stimulant
beta-carbolines, harmala alkaloids	numerous	MAOI
Cinnamon, camphor, cinnamaldehyde	Cinnamomum	blood sugar stabilizer, antioxidant
Quinine, quinidine, cinchonidine, cinchonine	Cinchona	antipyretic, analgesic, antimalarial
Safrole	Sassafras	
Huáng bǎi	Amur cork tree (Phellodendron amurense)	TCM
Strictamine	Alstonia scholaris	
	Slippery Elm (Ulmus rubra)	demulcent
Geniposidic acid	Eucommia ulmoides	
N-methyltryptamine, serotonin analogs	numerous species from Brazil, Mexico, Taiwan	serotonin agonist, neuroimmunologic modulator
Quassin	Quassia amara	various
Celastrol	Tripterygium wilfordii	various
Mitraphylline	Cat's claw (Uncaria tomentosa)	anti-inflammatory
Ellagic acid, rutin, gallic acid, ethyl gallate	Ailanthus altissima	various
Coronaridine, voacangine, ibogamine, ibogaine, tabernanthine	Voacanga africana, Tabernanthe iboga	neuroimmunologic modulator
Lapachol, quercetin	Pau D'Arco (Handroanthus impetiginosus)	therapeutic naphthoquinone
Icariin	Eucommia	PDE5 inhibitor
Baicalin	Oroxylum indicum	prolyl endopeptidase inhibitor
Frankincense, incensole	Boswellia sacra, Boswellia	incensole is a TRPV3 agonist
QS21	Quillaja saponaria (soap bark tree)	potential immunologic adjuvant
Sandalwood oil, α-Santalol, β-Santalol	Sandalwood (Santalum)	Ayurvedic component
Bergenin, α-viniferin, ε-viniferin, diptoindonesin A	Bergenia ligulata, Dryobalanops aromatica, Mallotus japonicus	component of Ayurvedic medicine "Paashaanbhed"
Phenolic lactones	Caesalpinia paraguariensis	component of Bolivian traditional medicine
Erythravine	Erythrina mulungu	Brazilian medicinal plant
Antimicrobial, anti-inflammatory compounds	Psidium guajava (Guava tree)	component of traditional medicine
Perfume resin	Agarwood / Oud Wood	aromatherapy
Opopanax, balsam, bdellium, bisabol	Myrrh (Commiphora)	component of Eastern-Mediterranean, Middle-Eastern, and North-African, traditional medicine
Rotenoids, piscidone	Jamaican dogwood (Piscidia piscipula)	component of Caribbean traditional medicine

== See also ==
- Lichen
- Rhizome
- Mycorrhiza
- History of aspirin
