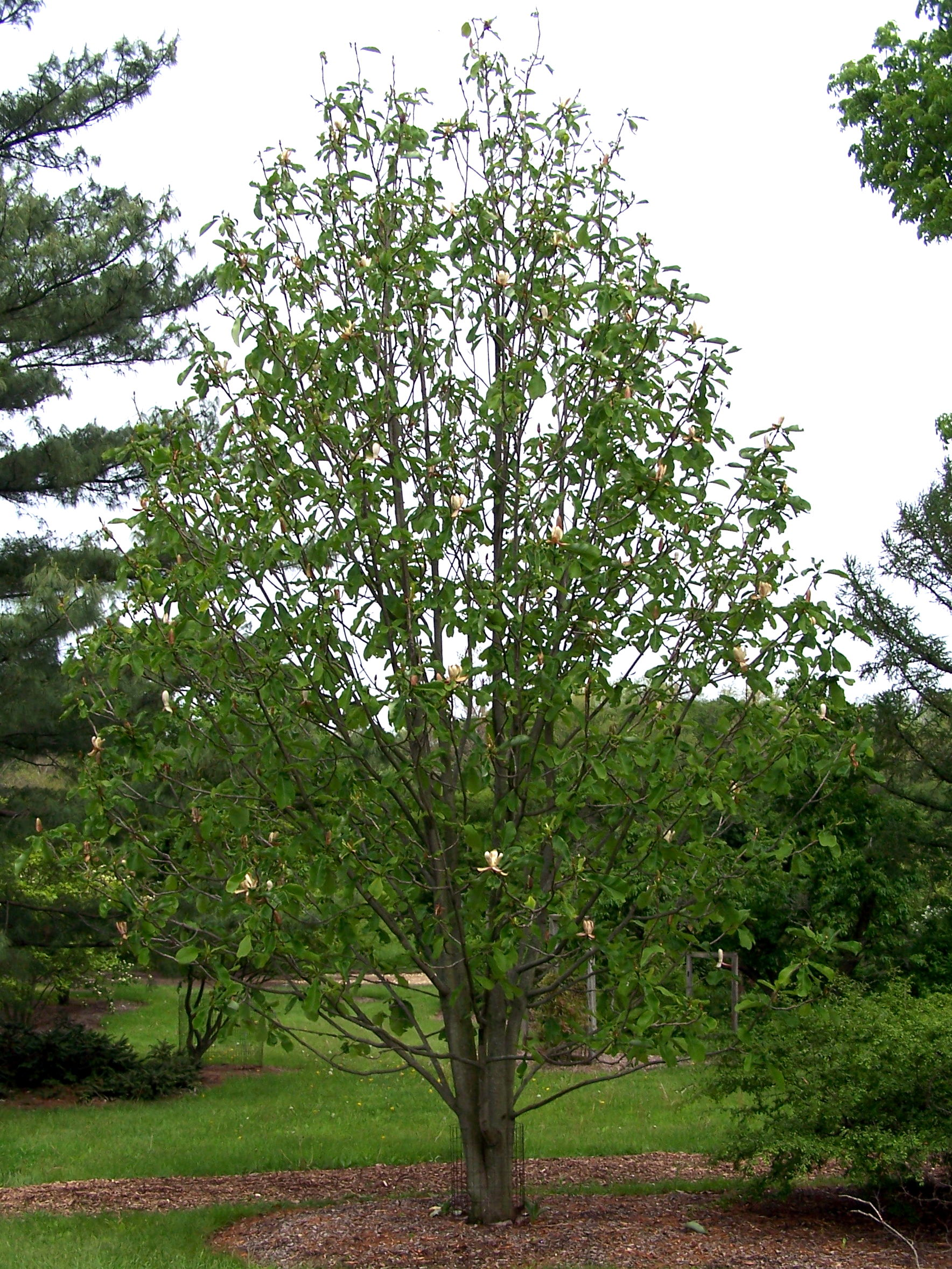
- Magnolia officinalis

Conservation status
- Endangered (IUCN 3.1)

Scientific classification
- Kingdom: Plantae
- Clade: Embryophytes
- Clade: Tracheophytes
- Clade: Spermatophytes
- Clade: Angiosperms
- Clade: Magnoliids
- Order: Magnoliales
- Family: Magnoliaceae
- Genus: Magnolia
- Subgenus: Magnolia subg. Magnolia
- Section: Magnolia sect. Rhytidospermum
- Subsection: Magnolia subsect. Rhytidospermum
- Species: M. officinalis

Binomial name
- Magnolia officinalis Rehder & E.H.Wilson

Varieties
- Magnolia officinalis var. biloba Rehder & E.H.Wilson; Magnolia officinalis var. officinalis

Synonyms
- Houpoea officinalis (Rehder & E.H.Wilson) N.H.Xia & C.Y.Wu (2008)

= Magnolia officinalis =

Species of flowering plant

Magnolia officinalis (commonly called houpu magnolia or magnolia bark) is a species of Magnolia native to the mountains and valleys of China at elevations of 300–1500 m. It is a deciduous tree up to 20 m tall with broad, fragrant white flowers and two varieties distinguished by leaf shape, differing slightly from Magnolia obovata primarily in fruit base shape.

Its aromatic bark, traditionally used in Chinese medicine as "hou po," is now primarily sourced from cultivated plants.

== Identification ==
It is a deciduous tree growing to 20 m in height. The bark is thick and brown, but does not fissure. The leaves are broad, ovate, 20–40 cm long, and 11–20 cm broad. The flowers are fragrant and 10–15 cm wide, with 9–12 (rarely to 17) white tepals, and appear from May to June.

The two varieties are:

- Magnolia officinalis var. officinalis has leaves with an acute apex.
- Magnolia officinalis var. biloba has leaves with a notch at the apex. This variety does not appear in the wild, and is only known in cultivation. It is possibly not a true variety at all, but actually a cultigen instead, though this has yet to be determined.

M. officinalis differs very little from Magnolia obovata; the only difference consistently observed between the two is that the fruit aggregate of M. officinalis has a rounded base, while that of M. obovata has an acute base. Further research may or may not eventually determine if M. officinalis should be treated as a subspecies of M. obovata.

== Uses ==
The highly aromatic bark is stripped from the stems, branches, and roots and used in traditional Chinese medicine, where it is known as hou po (厚朴; thus the common name). The traditional use indications are to eliminate damp and phlegm, and relieve distension.

== Gallery ==
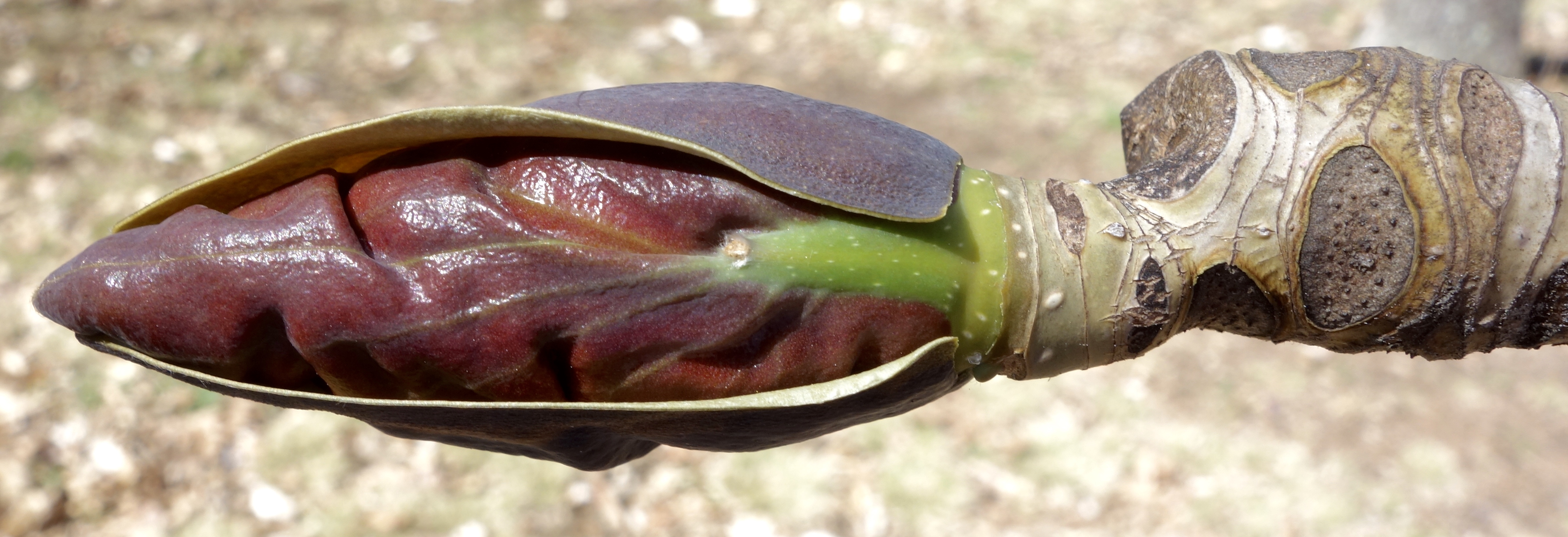
Bud
