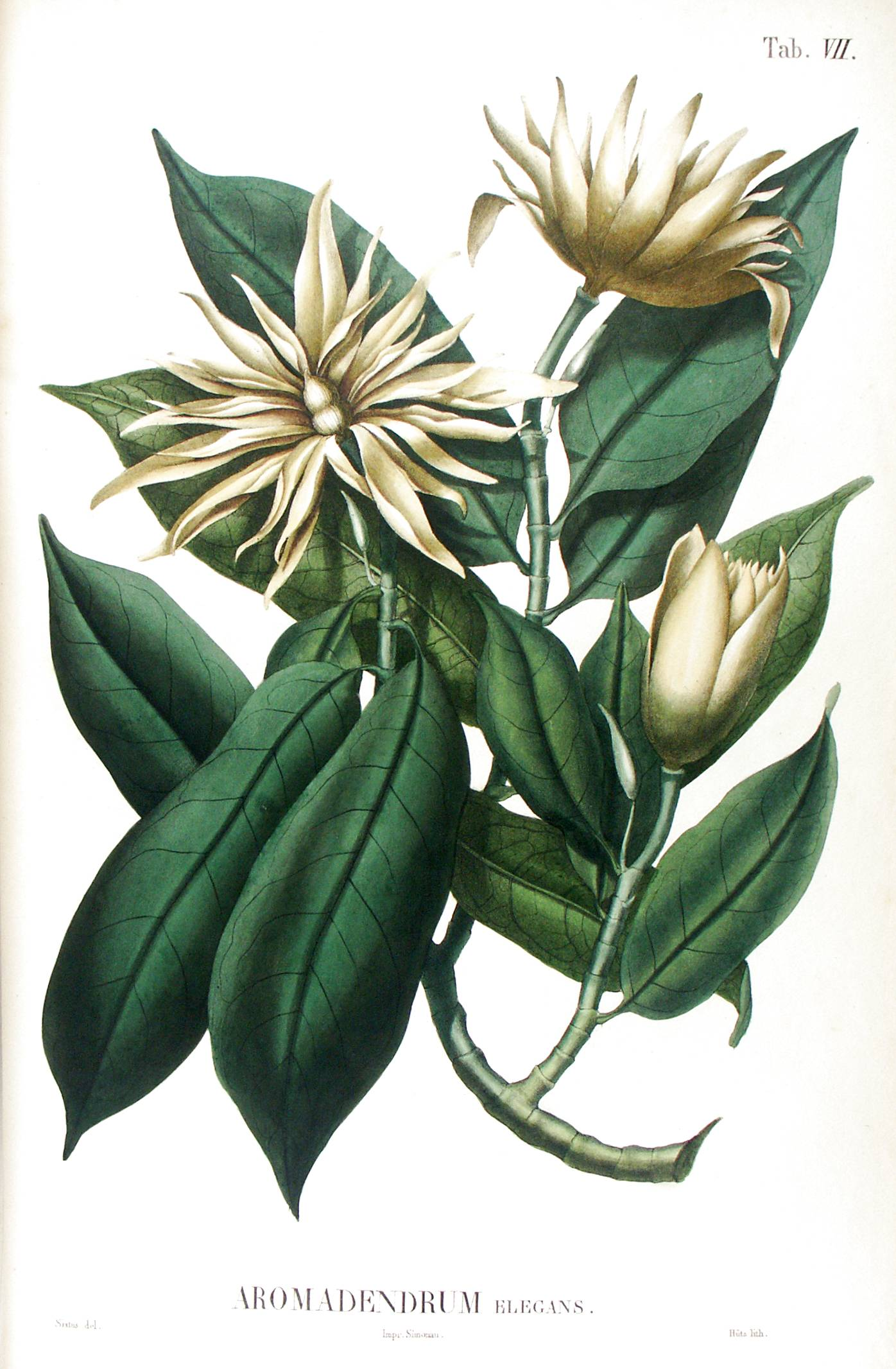
- Illustration, lithographed, hand-coloured of Aromadendron elegans Blume, the type species of genus Aromadendron. Plate VII in C.L. Blume, Flora Javae, pars 19-20 Magnoliaceae (1829)

Conservation status
- Data Deficient (IUCN 3.1)

Scientific classification
- Kingdom: Plantae
- Clade: Embryophytes
- Clade: Tracheophytes
- Clade: Spermatophytes
- Clade: Angiosperms
- Clade: Magnoliids
- Order: Magnoliales
- Family: Magnoliaceae
- Genus: Magnolia
- Subgenus: Magnolia subg. Yulania
- Section: Magnolia sect. Michelia
- Subsection: Magnolia subsect. Aromadendron
- Species: M. elegans

Binomial name
- Magnolia elegans (Blume) Keng

Synonyms
- Aromadendron elegans Blume, 1825; Aromadendron elegans var. glauca (Korth.) Dandy, 1928; Aromadendron glaucum Korth.; Michelia malayca D.L.Fu; Magnolia glauca (Korth.) Pierre; Manglietia oortii Korth.; Talauma elegans (Blume) Miq., 1868; Talauma elegans var. glauca (Korth.) P. Parm., 1896; Talauma glaucum (Korth.) Miq.

= Magnolia elegans =

Species of flowering plant

Magnolia elegans is a species of flowering plant the genus Magnolia. It is a tree native to Java, Sumatra, Peninsular Malaysia, and Peninsular Thailand.
