= Drug pleiotropy =

Drug's actions other than those for which the agent was specifically developed

In pharmacology, pleiotropy includes all of a drug's actions other than those for which the agent was specifically developed. It may include adverse effects which are detrimental ones, but is often used to denote additional beneficial effects.

For example, statins are HMG-CoA reductase inhibitors that primarily act by decreasing cholesterol synthesis, but which are believed to have other beneficial effects, including acting as antioxidants and stabilizing atherosclerotic plaques. Steroid drugs, such as prednisone and prednisolone, have pleiotropic effects, including systemic ones, for the same reason that endogenous steroid hormones do: cells throughout the body have receptors that can respond to them, because the endogenous ones are endocrine messengers.

Another example is melatonin, which has a wide range of effects on biological systems on multiple scales, from modulating the circadian rhythm and inducing sleep via the activation of melatoninergic receptors, to recepto-independent antioxydative and anti-inflammatory effects over all organs down to cells.

== See also ==
- Adverse effect
- Pleiotropy in genetics
