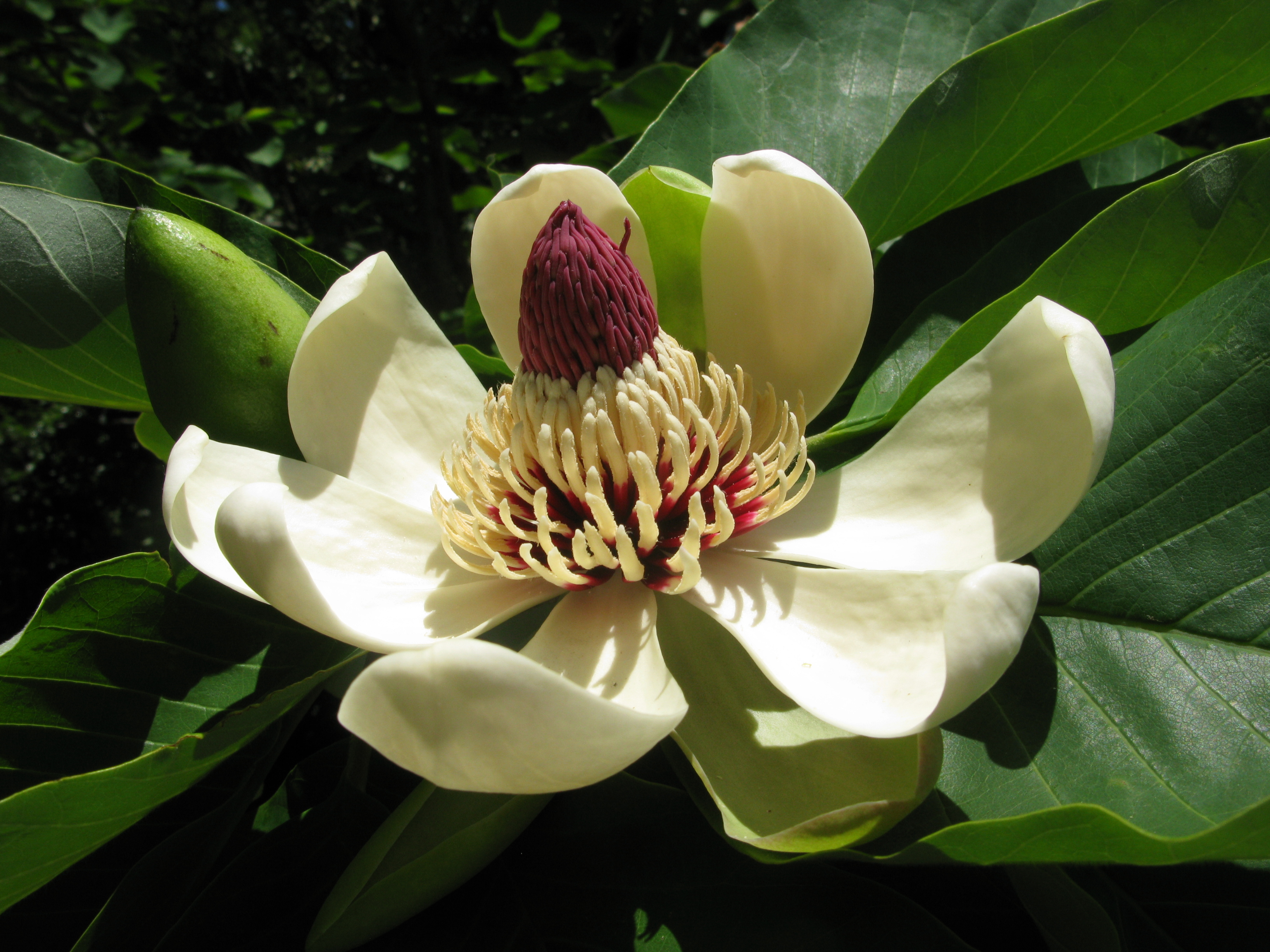

Conservation status
- Least Concern (IUCN 3.1)

Scientific classification
- Kingdom: Plantae
- Clade: Embryophytes
- Clade: Tracheophytes
- Clade: Spermatophytes
- Clade: Angiosperms
- Clade: Magnoliids
- Order: Magnoliales
- Family: Magnoliaceae
- Genus: Magnolia
- Subgenus: Magnolia subg. Magnolia
- Section: Magnolia sect. Rhytidospermum
- Subsection: Magnolia subsect. Rhytidospermum
- Species: M. obovata

Binomial name
- Magnolia obovata Thunb.

Synonyms
- Magnolia hypoleuca Sieb. & Zucc.

= Magnolia obovata =

Species of tree

Magnolia obovata, the Japanese cucumber tree, Japanese bigleaf magnolia, or Japanese whitebark magnolia, is a species of Magnolia, native to Japan and the adjacent Kurile Islands. It grows from near sea level up to 1,800 m elevation in mixed broadleaf forests.

== Description ==
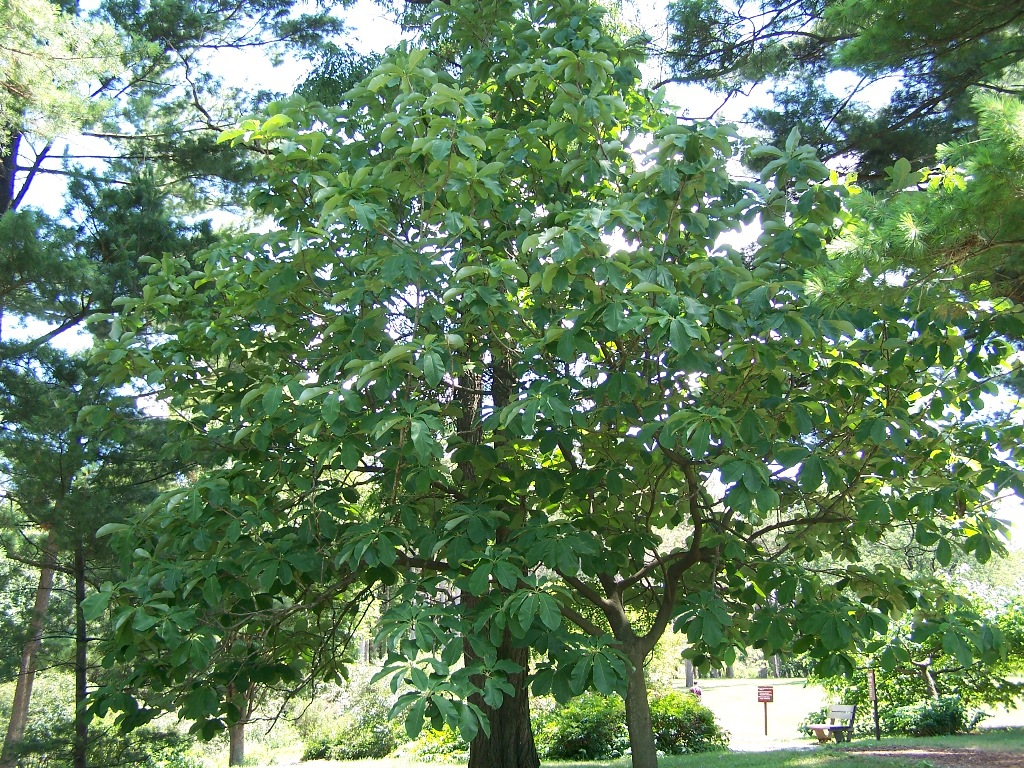
Tree

It is a medium-sized deciduous tree 15–30 m tall, with slate grey bark. The leaves are large, 16–38 cm (rarely to 50 cm) long and 9–20 cm (rarely 25 cm) broad, leathery, green above, silvery or greyish pubescent below, and with an acute apex. They are held in whorls of five to eight at the end of each shoot. The flowers are also large, cup-shaped, 15–20 cm diameter, with 9-12 creamy, fleshy tepals, red stamens; they have a strong scent, and are produced in early summer after the leaves expand. The fruit is an oblong-cylindric aggregate of follicles 12–20 cm long and 6 cm broad, bright pinkish red, each follicle containing one or two black seeds with a fleshy orange-red coating.

== Uses ==
The wood is strong, light, and easy to work, sought by craftsmen. In parts of Japan, the large leaves are used for wrapping food, and also as a makeshift dish to grill meat or vegetables, such as leeks, mushrooms, and miso in hoba miso.
