= Erysodienone =

Names
- IUPAC name 16-Hydroxy-3,15-dimethoxy-1,3,4,6-tetradehydroerythrinan-2-one
- Systematic IUPAC name (9bS)-7-Hydroxy-8,11-dimethoxy-1,2,4,5-tetrahydro-12H-indolo[7a,1-a]isoquinolin-12-one

Identifiers
CAS Number	5531-67-9
3D model (JSmol)	Interactive image
ChemSpider	74174422
PubChem CID	101277375
CompTox Dashboard (EPA)	DTXSID40970637
- InChI: InChI=1S/C18H19NO4/c1-22-16-9-13-11(7-14(16)20)3-5-19-6-4-12-8-15(21)17(23-2)10-18(12,13)19/h7-10,20H,3-6H2,1-2H3/t18-/m0/s1 Key: QVVZUVOFOCDCTO-SFHVURJKSA-N
- SMILES: COC1=C(C=C2CCN3CCC4=CC(=O)C(=C[C@@]43C2=C1)OC)O

Properties
Chemical formula	C_{18}H_{19}NO_{4}
Molar mass	313.353 g·mol^{−1}
- Except where otherwise noted, data are given for materials in their standard state (at 25 °C [77 °F], 100 kPa). Infobox references

Erysodienone is a key precursor in the biosynthesis of many Erythrina-produced alkaloids. Early work was done by Derek Barton and co-workers to illustrate the biosynthetic pathways towards erythrina alkaloids. It was demonstrated that erysodienone could be synthesized from simple starting materials by a similar approach as its biosynthetic pathway, which led to the development of the biomimetic synthesis of erysodienone.

== Synthesis ==
The biosynthesis of erysodienone involves a key step of oxidative phenol coupling. Starting with S-norprotosinomenine precursor A, cyclization via oxidative phenol coupling forms intermediate B, which in turn can be rearranged to form intermediate C. Hydrogenation of C forms the diphenoquinone intermediate E. An intramolecular Michael addition reaction converts E to the final product, erysodienone.

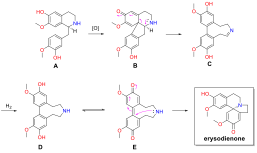
Proposed biosynthetic pathway of erysodienone

A biomimetic synthesis route for erysodienone was developed based on a similar oxidative phenol coupling mechanism. Barton and co-workers found that treating bisphenolethylamine precursor F with oxidants such as K3Fe(CN)6 initiated oxidative phenol coupling to form the 9-membered ring structure in intermediate D that itself undergo a Michael addition to give erysodienone.

Biomimetic synthesis of erysodienone
