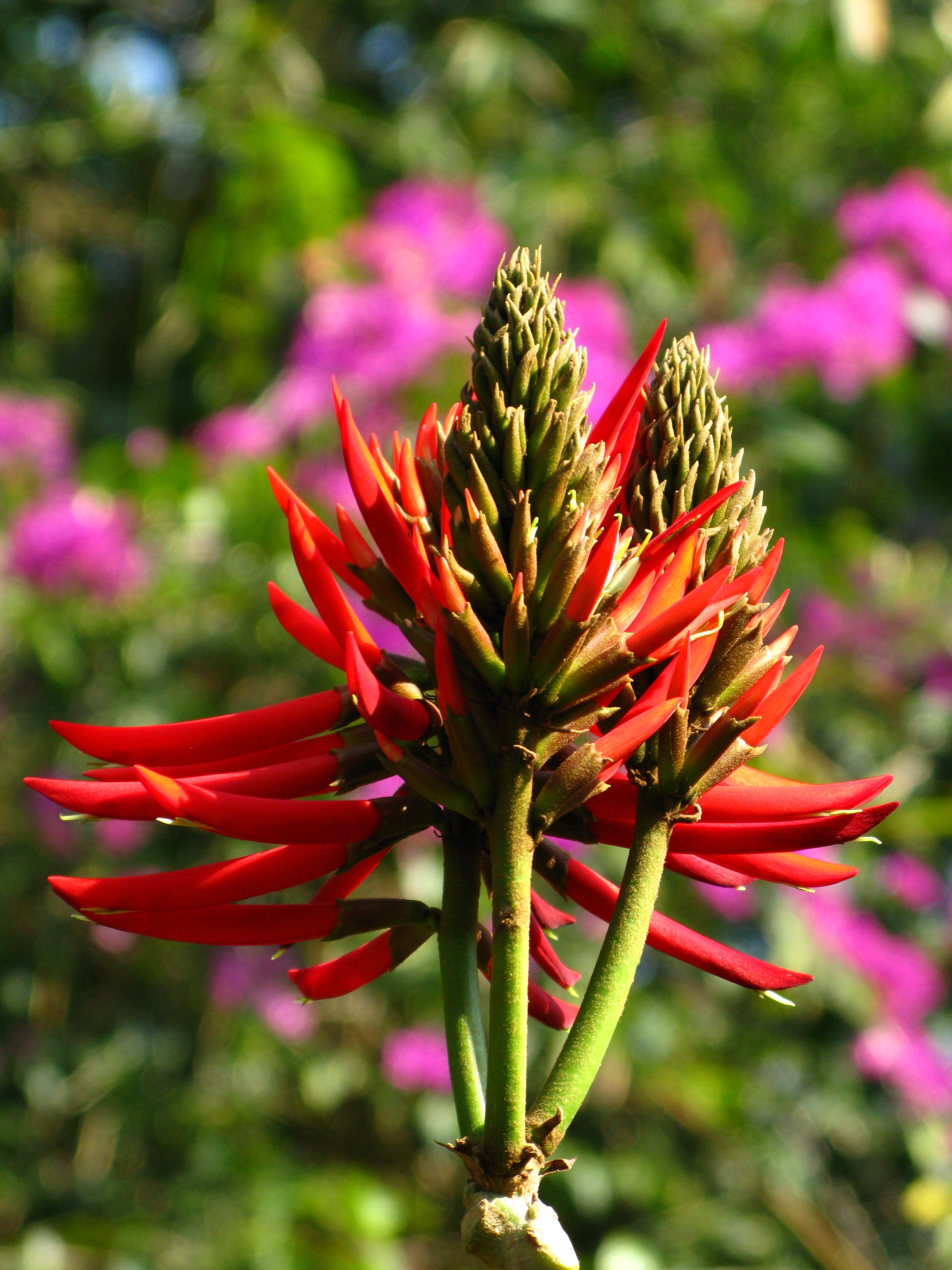
- Flower close up

Conservation status
- Least Concern (IUCN 3.1)

Scientific classification
- Kingdom: Plantae
- Clade: Tracheophytes
- Clade: Angiosperms
- Clade: Eudicots
- Clade: Rosids
- Order: Fabales
- Family: Fabaceae
- Subfamily: Faboideae
- Genus: Erythrina
- Species: E. speciosa

Binomial name
- Erythrina speciosa Andrews

= Erythrina speciosa =

Species of legume

Erythrina speciosa is a tree native to Brazil, which is often cultivated and has introduced populations in Africa and India. It is pollinated by hummingbirds.

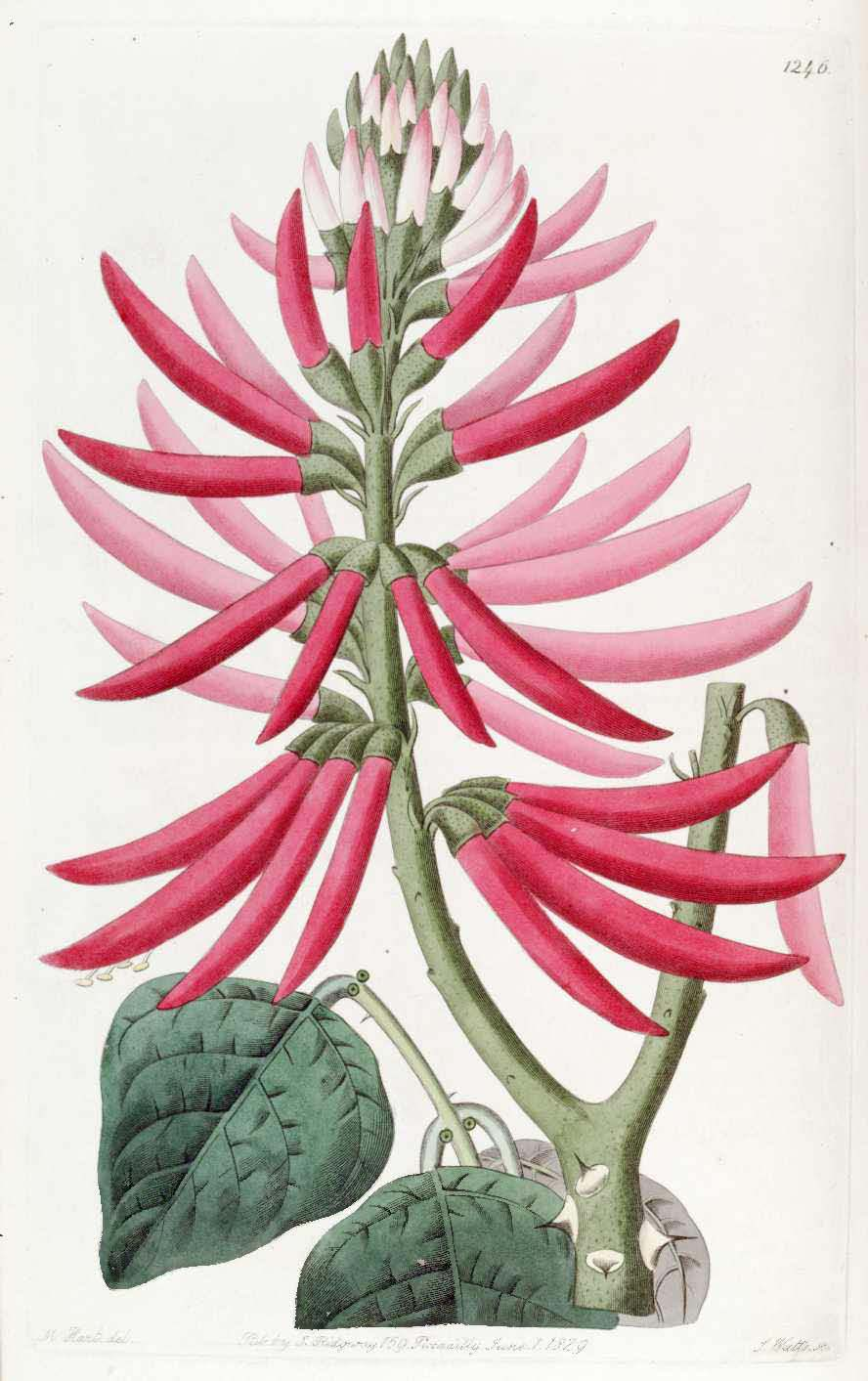
Illustration by M. Hart
