= Erythrina ankaranensis =

Conservation status
- Endangered (IUCN 3.1)

Scientific classification
- Kingdom: Plantae
- Clade: Tracheophytes
- Clade: Angiosperms
- Clade: Eudicots
- Clade: Rosids
- Order: Fabales
- Family: Fabaceae
- Subfamily: Faboideae
- Genus: Erythrina
- Species: E. ankaranensis

Binomial name
- Erythrina ankaranensis Du Puy & Labat

Species of legume

Erythrina ankaranensis is a species of legume in the family Fabaceae. It is found only in Madagascar.
