= Erythrina standleyana =

- Erythrina standleyana inflorescence on a leafless tree during the dry season

Conservation status
- Least Concern (IUCN 3.1)

Scientific classification
- Kingdom: Plantae
- Clade: Tracheophytes
- Clade: Angiosperms
- Clade: Eudicots
- Clade: Rosids
- Order: Fabales
- Family: Fabaceae
- Subfamily: Faboideae
- Genus: Erythrina
- Species: E. standleyana

Binomial name
- Erythrina standleyana Krukoff

Species of plant

Previous season's split-open fruit husk on a leafless tree during dry season

Erythrina standleyana, one of many species that can be called coral tree, is a small tree occurring from Mexico to Guatemala, and in western Cuba. It belongs to the family Fabaceae.

== Description ==
Erythrina standleyana is a slender tree up to 6 m (20 ft) tall. With its trifoliate leaves and pyramid-shaped inflorescence of red flowers, it is similar to numerous other Erythrina species. Here are key features helping to distinguish this species:

- Stems are armed with spines, and branchlets are stout. The tree can bear leaves when it flowers or, as indicated by images on this page, if it flowers during the dry season it can be completely leafless.
- Its leaves, with petioles up to 13 cm (5 in) long, have 3 papery leaflets which are hairy when young but lose the hairs with age. The middle leaflet, up to 13 cm × 12 cm (5 in × 4 1/2 in) in size, is almost circular to egg-shaped or somewhat triangular.
- Inflorescences are racemes with flowers on pedicels up to 6 mm (1/4 in) long. The red, papilionaceous flowers are exceptionally long and slender, with the top petal up to 6.5 cm (2 1/2 in) long.
- The capsular-type fruits, or legumes, are semi-woody and up to 20 cm (8 in) long, with deep constrictions between the seeds. The 1 to many seeds are red with a thin, straight, black line extending from the hilum.

== Distribution ==
In Mexico, Erythrina standleyana occurs in the southern and eastern states of Campeche, Chiapas, Hidalgo, Oaxaca, Puebla, Querétaro, Quintana Roo, San Luis Potosí, Tabasco, Tamaulipas, Veracruz and Yucatan. Also it occurs in Belize, northern Guatemala and western Cuba.

== Habitat ==
In the Mexican state of Campeche, Erythrina standleyana occurs in tropical, flood-prone, low-growing forest with semi-deciduous trees. Images on this page show an individual growing in dry forest in north-central Yucatán, on limestone.

== Toxicity ==
Eating the leaves and flowers of Erythrina standleyana provokes drowsiness, or somnolence, while eating the seeds produces serious stomach disorders accompanied by vomiting.

== Uses by humans ==
=== In traditional medicine ===
Bark and leaves of Erythrina standleyana have been used during childbirth and to treat toothache and nosebleed.

=== In traditional Mayan ceremonies ===
In Mexico's Yucatan Peninsula, the seeds of Erythrina standleyana are believed to offer magical protection against "evil winds," or vientos malos. These winds are considered to be living entities which are guardians, protectors, evil or supernatural beings, or even a person's own breath. The Mayan people place seeds on the altar during the rain ceremony cháchak.

=== Edible flowers ===
In Mexico's Yucatan Peninsula, the flowers of Erythrina standleyana are eaten, though they are known to produce drowsiness.

=== Ornamental beans ===
In Mexico's Yucatan Peninsula, the bright red seeds are used to make necklaces.

=== In Agroforestry ===
In Guatemala, where coffee plants are grown in plantations in diffuse light below a canopy of trees, Erythrina standleyana is recognized as a typical species providing shade, thus contributing to coffee production. The species also is used generally as living fence posts.

=== As an ornamental ===
In Mexico, Erythrina standleyana is recommended for use in parks, urban green areas and gardens.

== Taxonomy ==
In 1939, Boris Alexander Krukoff formally named and described Erythrina standleyana; since that time the taxon's name and taxonomic concept has remained unchanged.

=== Etymology ===
The genus name Erythrina derives from the Greek erythros, which means "red," referring to the red flower color of most species.

The species name standleyana honors Paul Carpenter Standley, who contributed greatly to botanical knowledge of the region where Erythrina standleyana occurs.
