= Erythrina elenae =

Conservation status
- Vulnerable (IUCN 2.3)

Scientific classification
- Kingdom: Plantae
- Clade: Tracheophytes
- Clade: Angiosperms
- Clade: Eudicots
- Clade: Rosids
- Order: Fabales
- Family: Fabaceae
- Subfamily: Faboideae
- Genus: Erythrina
- Species: E. elenae

Binomial name
- Erythrina elenae Howard & Briggs

Species of legume

Erythrina elenae is a species of legume in the family Fabaceae. It is found only in Cuba. It is threatened by habitat loss.
