= Erythrina tahitensis =

Conservation status
- Critically Endangered (IUCN 3.1)

Scientific classification
- Kingdom: Plantae
- Clade: Tracheophytes
- Clade: Angiosperms
- Clade: Eudicots
- Clade: Rosids
- Order: Fabales
- Family: Fabaceae
- Subfamily: Faboideae
- Genus: Erythrina
- Species: E. tahitensis

Binomial name
- Erythrina tahitensis Nadeaud

Species of legume

Erythrina tahitensis is a tree in the family Fabaceae. It is endemic to the island of Tahiti in the Society Islands of French Polynesia.
