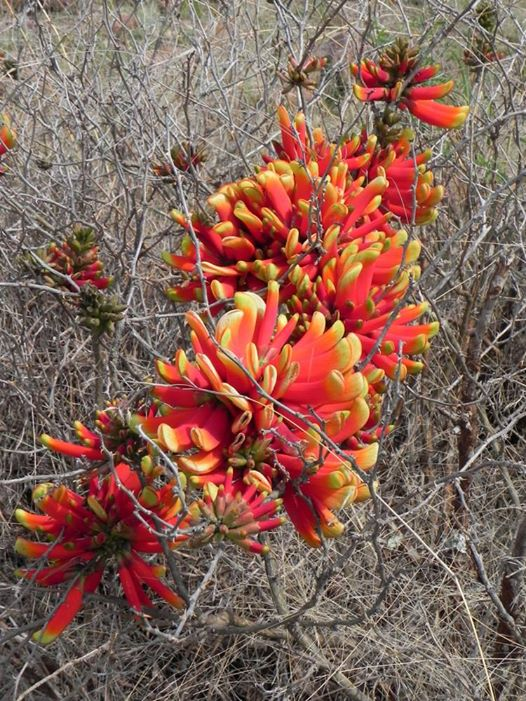
- Queenstown Area, Cape Province

Scientific classification
- Kingdom: Plantae
- Clade: Tracheophytes
- Clade: Angiosperms
- Clade: Eudicots
- Clade: Rosids
- Order: Fabales
- Family: Fabaceae
- Subfamily: Faboideae
- Genus: Erythrina
- Species: E. acanthocarpa

Binomial name
- Erythrina acanthocarpa E.Mey.

Synonyms
- Corallodendron acanthocarpum (E.Mey.) Kuntze

= Erythrina acanthocarpa =

Species of legume

Erythrina acanthocarpa (common name - Tambuki thorn) is a species of Erythrina in the family Fabaceae, and was first described in 1835 by Ernst Heinrich Friedrich Meyer. It is found in South Africa, where it is native to the Cape and Northern Provinces, but introduced in Free State. It is a succulent, nitrogen-fixing shrub.

== Etymology ==
The species epithet, acanthocarpos, derives from two Greek words, akanthos (spine, thorn) and karpos (fruit) and thus describes the plant as having spiny fruits.

== Conservation status ==
Under the South African Red Listing of taxa under threat, it is listed as being of "least concern."
