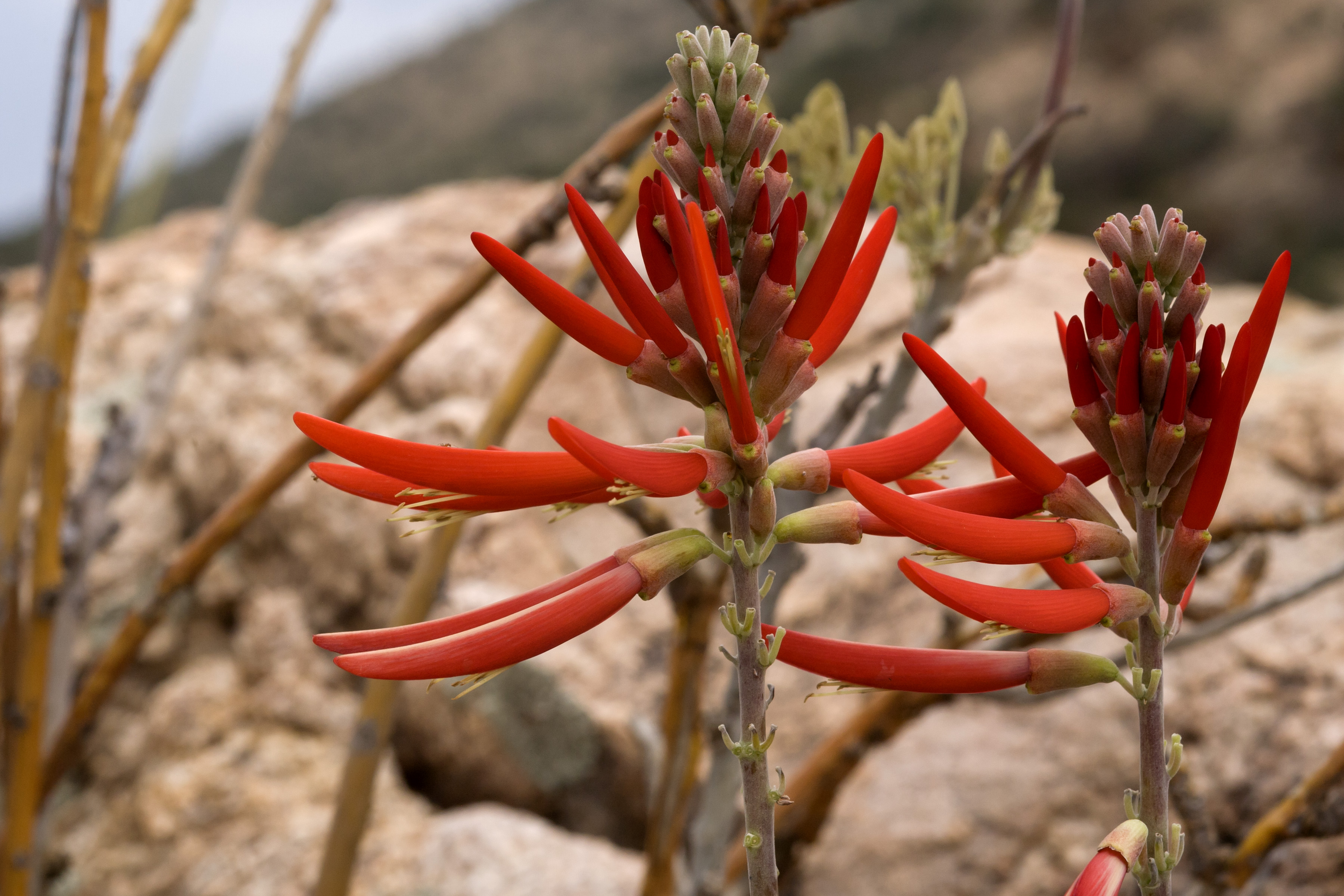

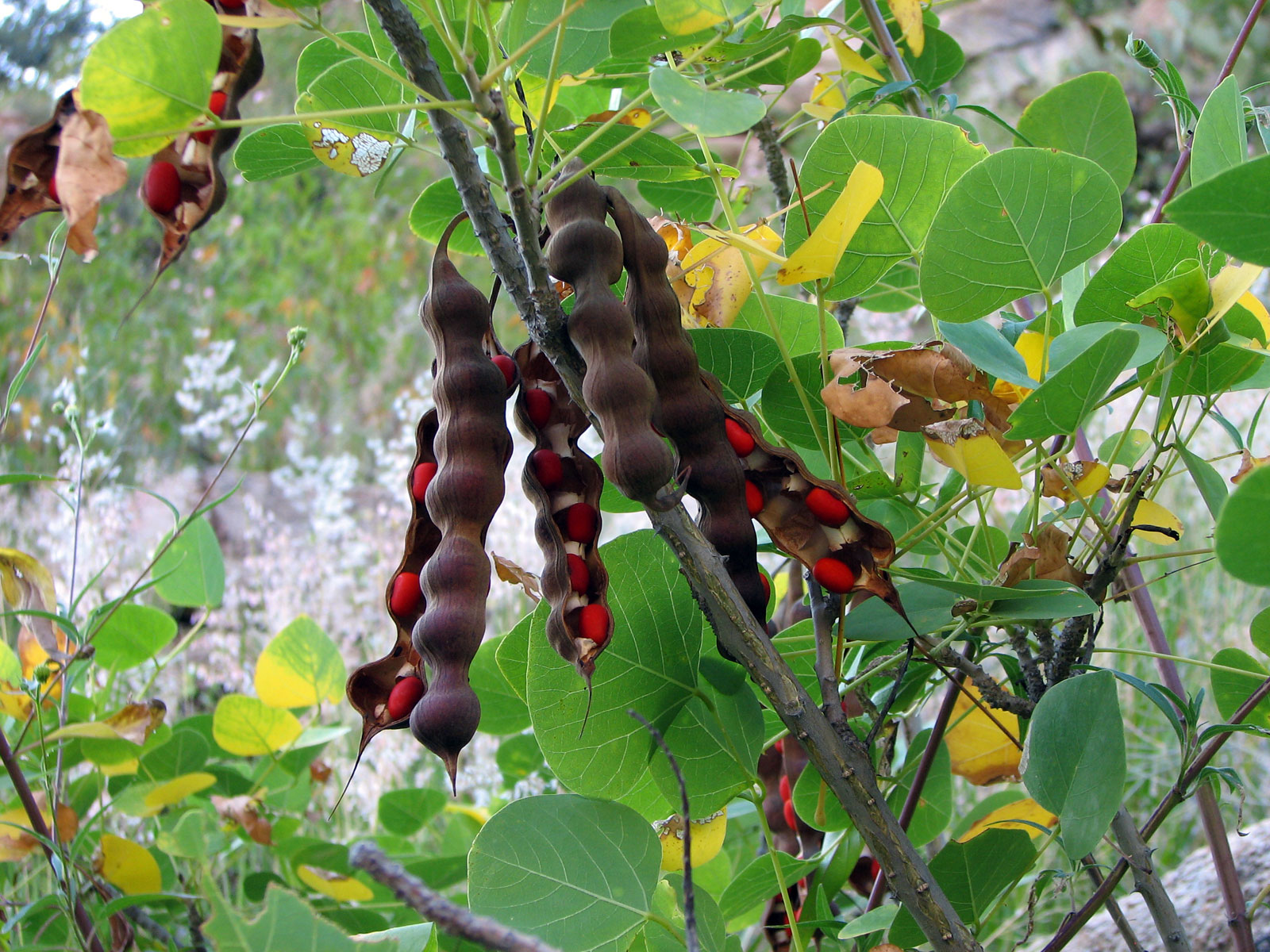

Conservation status
- Least Concern (IUCN 3.1)

Scientific classification
- Kingdom: Plantae
- Clade: Tracheophytes
- Clade: Angiosperms
- Clade: Eudicots
- Clade: Rosids
- Order: Fabales
- Family: Fabaceae
- Subfamily: Faboideae
- Genus: Erythrina
- Species: E. flabelliformis

Binomial name
- Erythrina flabelliformis Kearney

Synonyms
- Erythrina purpusii Brandegee

= Erythrina flabelliformis =

Chilicote

Species of legume

Erythrina flabelliformis, common name chilicote or western coral bean, is a plant species native to central and northwestern Mexico and the southwestern United States. It is known from Baja California as far south as Morelos and as far east as San Luis Potosí, as well as from Arizona and New Mexico.

Erythrina flabelliformis is a shrub or small tree up to 3 m (10 feet) high. Stems are white and covered with a velvety pubescence when young, armed with curved prickles about 6 mm (0.25 inches) long. Leaves trifoliate, leaflets stiff and leathery, generally broader than long. Flowers are crowded in terminal racemes, bright scarlet, about 4 cm (1.6 inches) long. Fruit tapers toward both ends, covered with tiny but dense hairs. Seeds are oval, up to 15 mm (0.6 inches) across, scarlet with a white hilum.

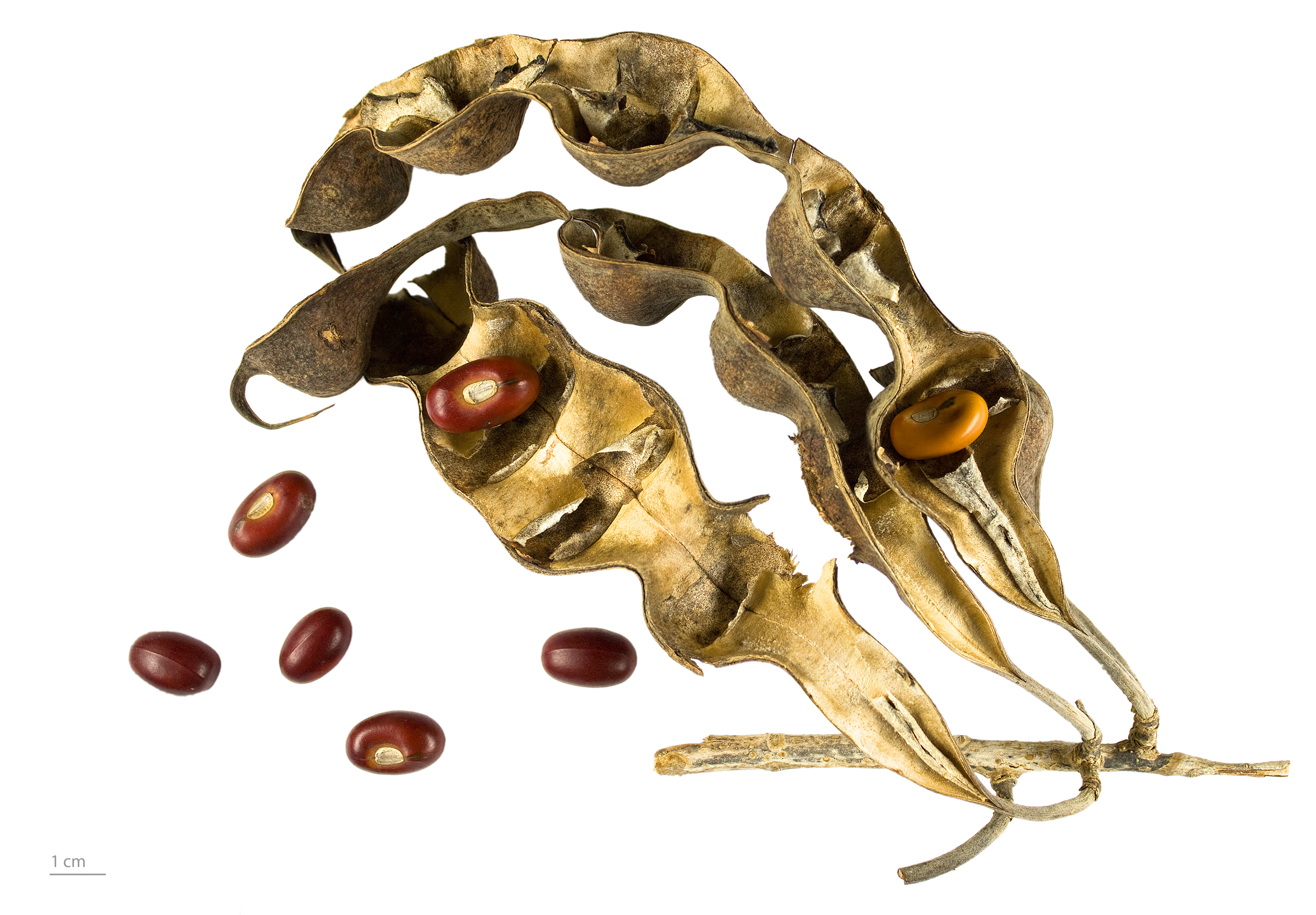
Dehisced seed pod with seeds

The seed walls are potentially lethal if consumed due to the alkaloids contained in them.
