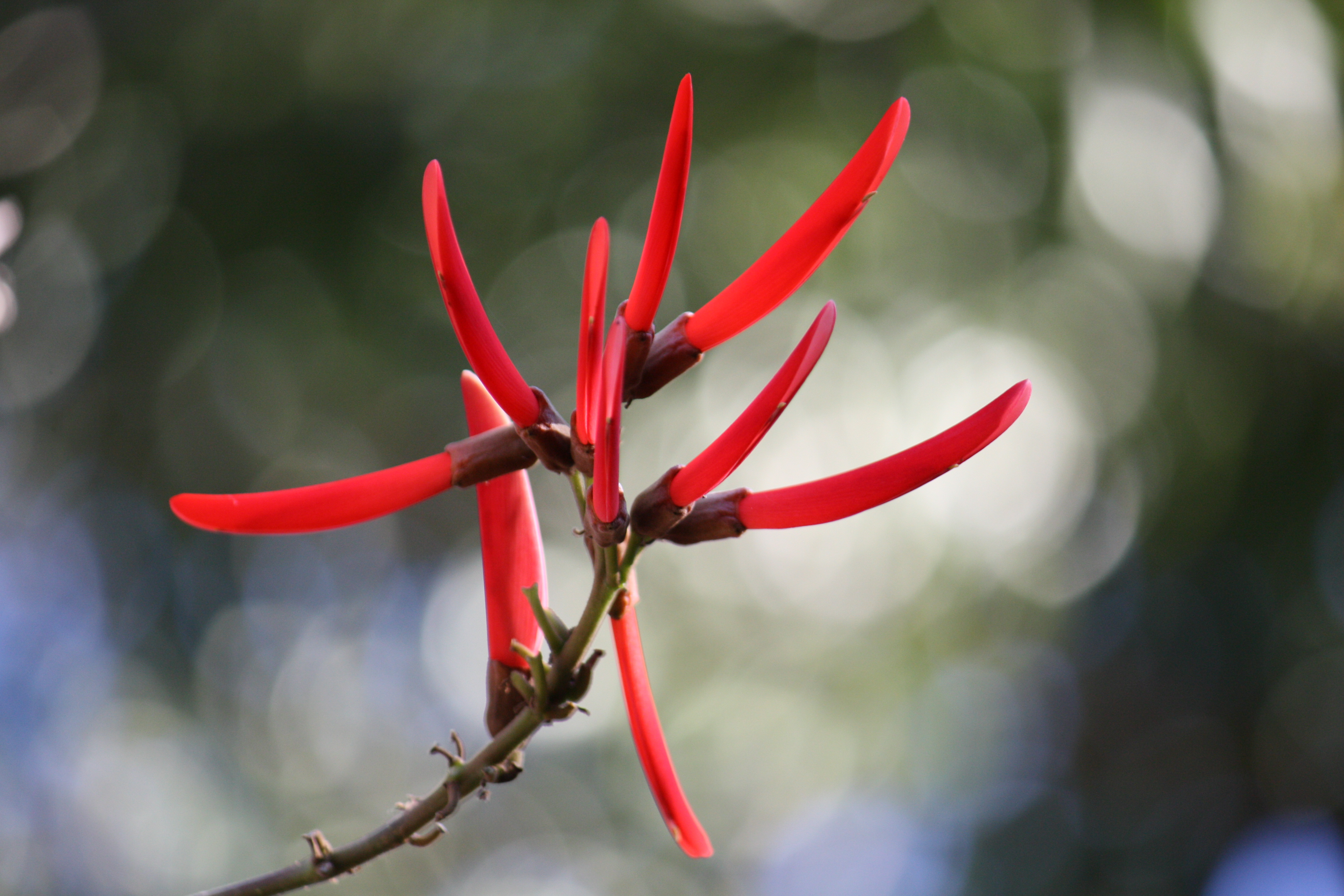

Scientific classification
- Kingdom: Plantae
- Clade: Tracheophytes
- Clade: Angiosperms
- Clade: Eudicots
- Clade: Rosids
- Order: Fabales
- Family: Fabaceae
- Subfamily: Faboideae
- Genus: Erythrina
- Species: E. atitlanensis

Binomial name
- Erythrina atitlanensis Krukoff & Barneby

= Erythrina atitlanensis =

Species of legume

Erythrina atitlanensis is a species of legume in the family Fabaceae. It is found in Mexico and Central America.
