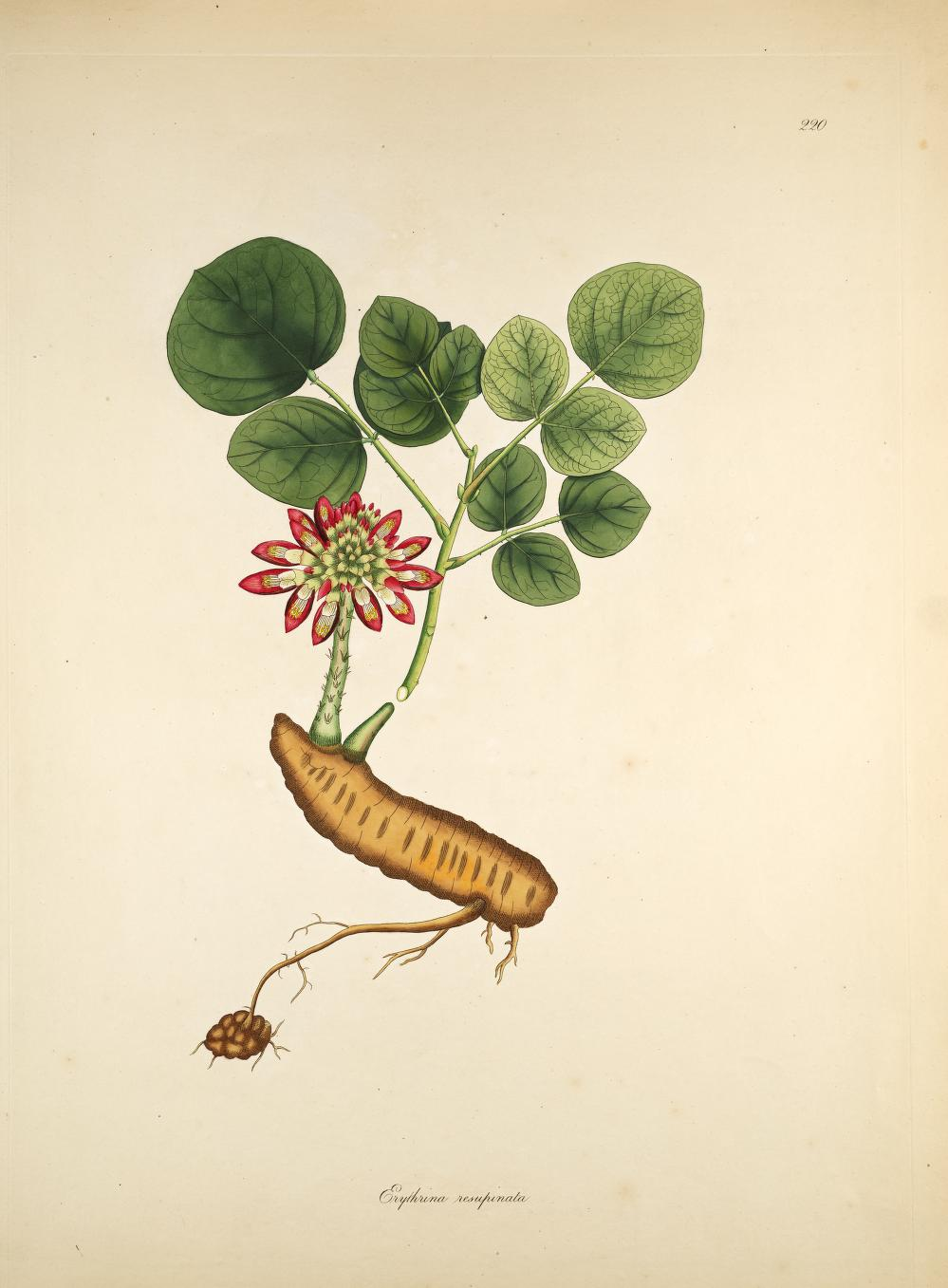
- Plant with flower

Scientific classification
- Kingdom: Plantae
- Clade: Embryophytes
- Clade: Tracheophytes
- Clade: Angiosperms
- Clade: Eudicots
- Clade: Rosids
- Order: Fabales
- Family: Fabaceae
- Subfamily: Faboideae
- Genus: Erythrina
- Species: E. resupinata

Binomial name
- Erythrina resupinata Roxb.

Synonyms
- List: Corallodendron resupinatum (Roxb.) Kuntze; Duchassaingia resupinata (Roxb.) Walp.

= Erythrina resupinata =

Species of flowering plant

Erythrina resupinata, is a species of flowering plant in the family Fabaceae. It is endemic to the Indian subcontinent.
