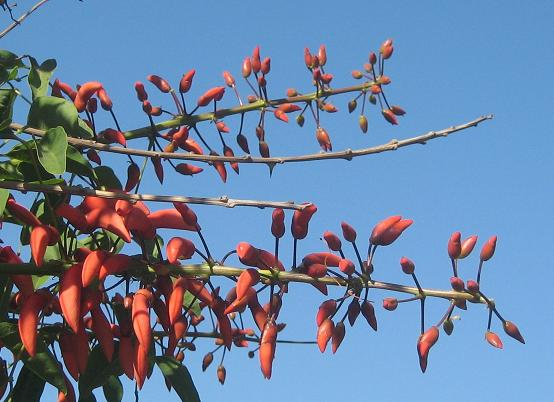

Scientific classification
- Kingdom: Plantae
- Clade: Tracheophytes
- Clade: Angiosperms
- Clade: Eudicots
- Clade: Rosids
- Order: Fabales
- Family: Fabaceae
- Subfamily: Faboideae
- Genus: Erythrina
- Species: E. falcata

Binomial name
- Erythrina falcata Benth.

Synonyms
- Corallodendron falcatum (Benth.) Kuntze; Erythrina crista-galli var. inermis Speg.; Erythrina martii Colla

= Erythrina falcata =

Species of legume

Erythrina falcata, commonly known as the Brazilian coral tree, is a timber tree in the family Fabaceae native to tropical South America. It can be found in Argentina, Bolivia the Atlantic Forest vegetation in Brazil, Paraguay and Peru. This plant is also used as a medicinal plant and ornamental plant which is attractive to birds.

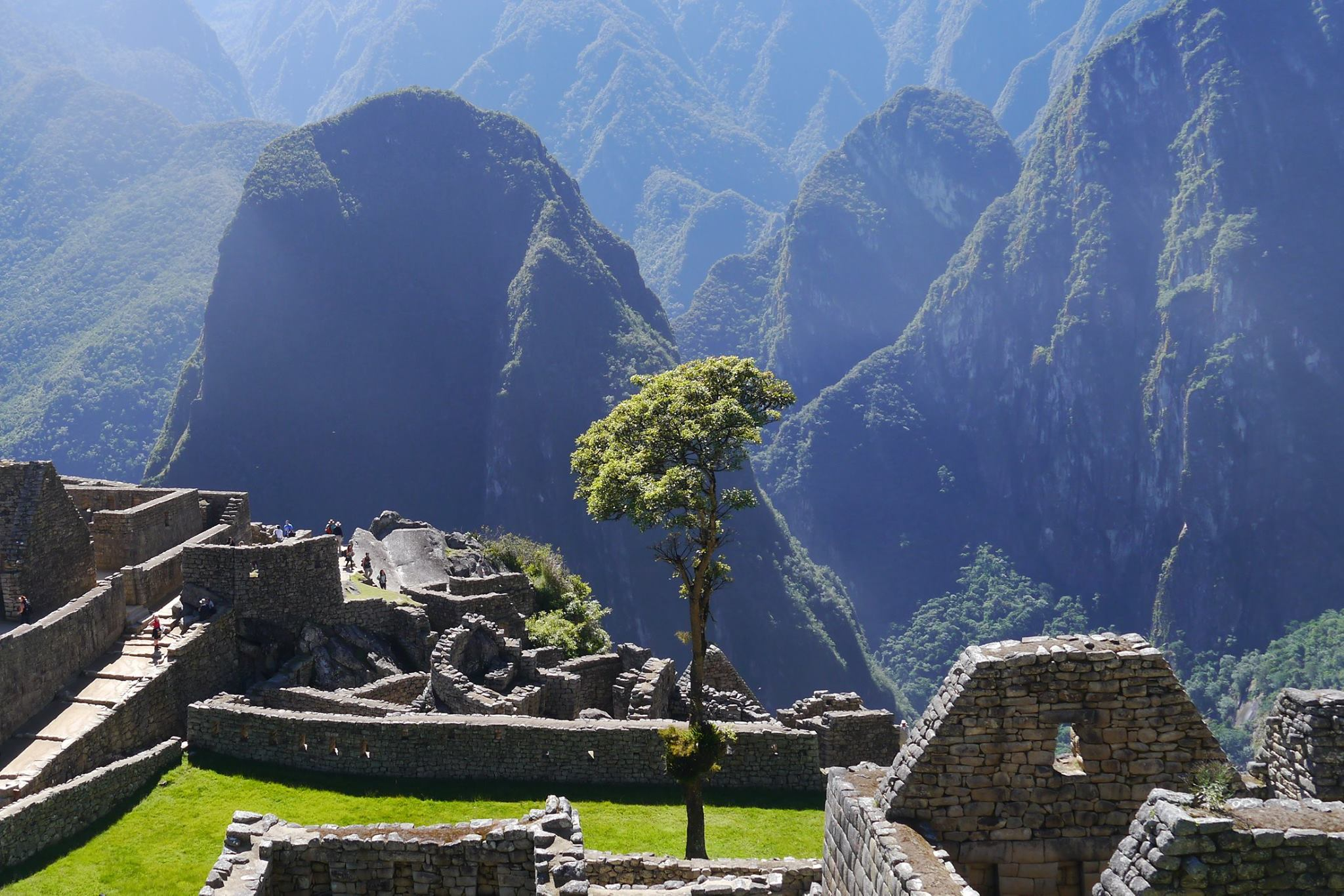
Erythrina falcata in Machu Picchu, Peru
