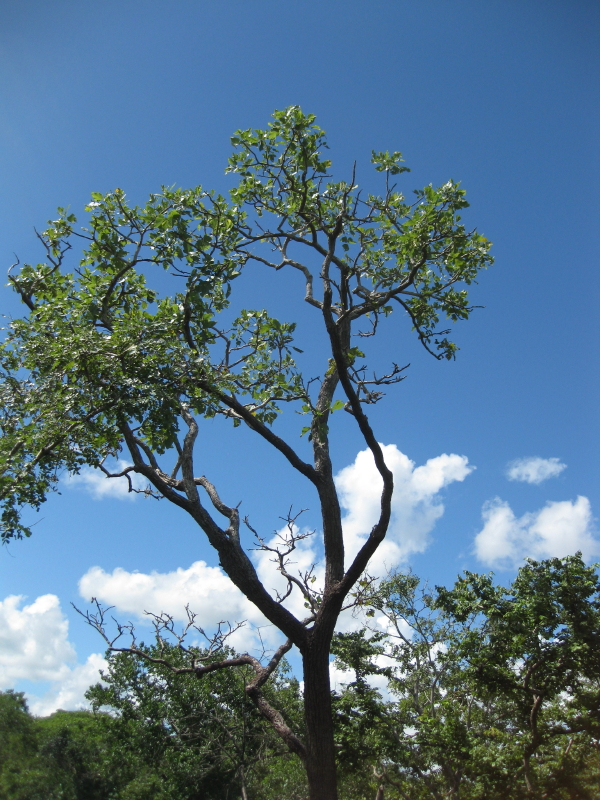

Conservation status
- Vulnerable (IUCN 3.1)

Scientific classification
- Kingdom: Plantae
- Clade: Tracheophytes
- Clade: Angiosperms
- Clade: Eudicots
- Clade: Rosids
- Order: Fabales
- Family: Fabaceae
- Subfamily: Faboideae
- Genus: Erythrina
- Species: E. haerdii

Binomial name
- Erythrina haerdii Verdc.

= Erythrina haerdii =

Species of legume

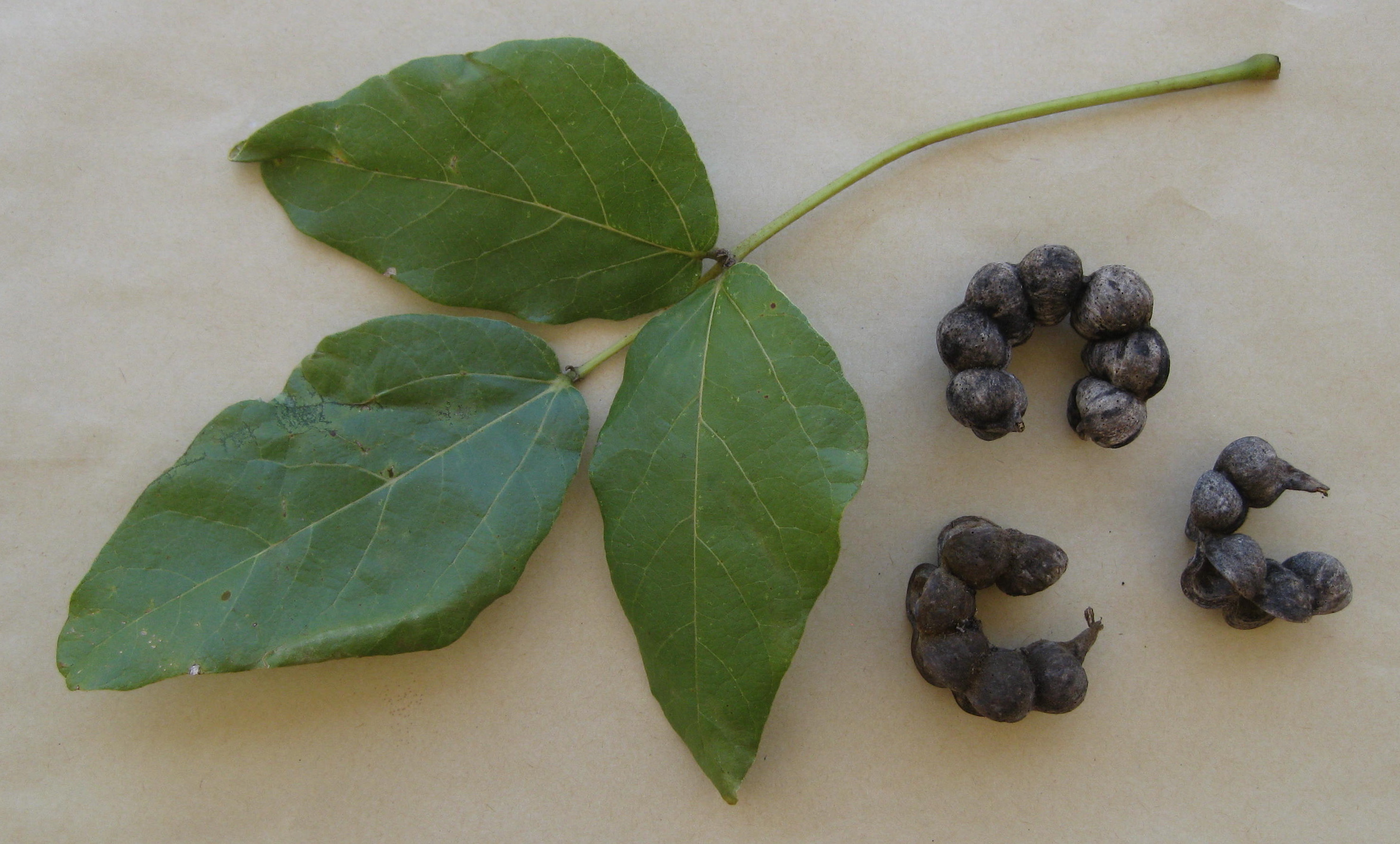
Erythrina haerdii leaf and pods

Erythrina haerdii is a species of legume in the family Fabaceae. It is found only in Tanzania.
