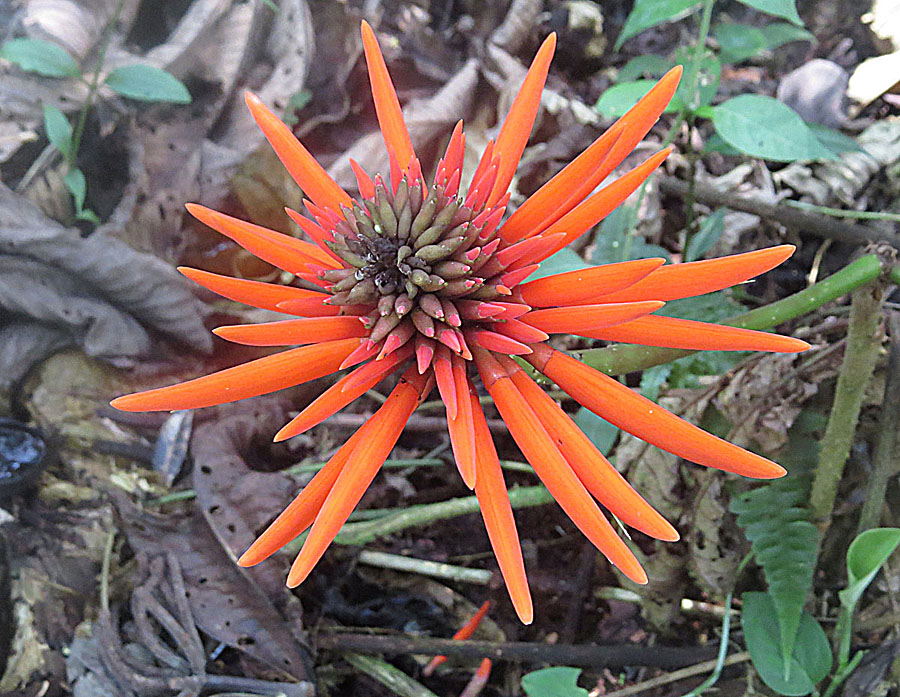

Conservation status
- Near Threatened (IUCN 3.1)

Scientific classification
- Kingdom: Plantae
- Clade: Tracheophytes
- Clade: Angiosperms
- Clade: Eudicots
- Clade: Rosids
- Order: Fabales
- Family: Fabaceae
- Subfamily: Faboideae
- Genus: Erythrina
- Species: E. schimpffii

Binomial name
- Erythrina schimpffii Diels

= Erythrina schimpffii =

Species of legume

Erythrina schimpffii is a species of legume in the family Fabaceae. It is found only in Ecuador. Its natural habitat is both the subtropical and tropical moist montane forests.
