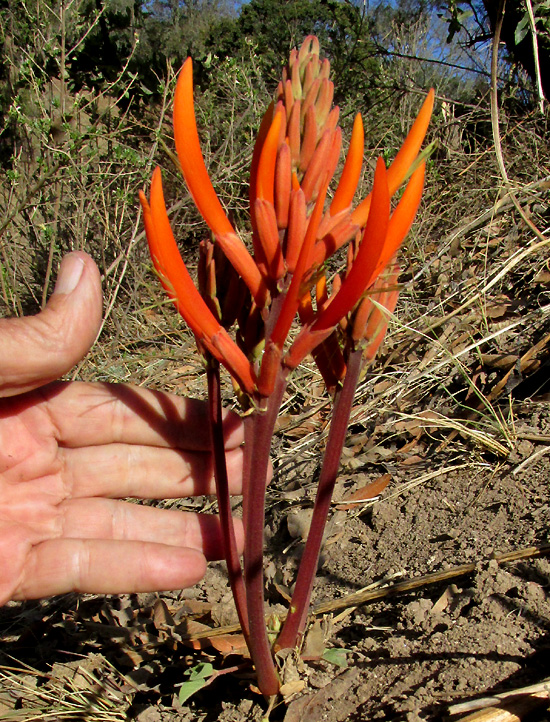

Scientific classification
- Kingdom: Plantae
- Clade: Tracheophytes
- Clade: Angiosperms
- Clade: Eudicots
- Clade: Rosids
- Order: Fabales
- Family: Fabaceae
- Subfamily: Faboideae
- Genus: Erythrina
- Species: E. leptorhiza

Binomial name
- Erythrina leptorhiza Moc. & Sessé ex DC.

= Erythrina leptorhiza =

Species of plant

Erythrina leptorhiza is a plant species belonging to the family Fabaceae.

== Description ==
Unlike most Erythrina species, which usually are woody trees or shrubs, Erythrina leptorhiza is a perennial which is herbaceous. Otherwise its bright orange flowers and trifoliate leaves are typical of the genus. During most of the plant's flowering period it bears leaves. However, just as its striking clusters of flowers, or inflorescences, emerge from the soil atop stiff peduncles, they may appear as if they are rising leafless directly from the ground.

The plant bears no English name, but in Mexico sometimes is known by its indigenous names of ococha, patol or cochizquilit.

== Range ==
Highlands of Mexico's Western Sierra Madres and central Mexico south into Oaxaca

== Taxonomy ==
Erythrina leptorhiza is very similar to Erythrina herbacea of the southeastern United States and northeastern Mexico, and earlier was considered to be the same species.
