= Erythrina schliebenii =

Conservation status
- Critically Endangered (IUCN 3.1)

Scientific classification
- Kingdom: Plantae
- Clade: Tracheophytes
- Clade: Angiosperms
- Clade: Eudicots
- Clade: Rosids
- Order: Fabales
- Family: Fabaceae
- Subfamily: Faboideae
- Genus: Erythrina
- Species: E. schliebenii

Binomial name
- Erythrina schliebenii Harms

Species of legume

Erythrina schliebenii is a species of legume in the family Fabaceae. It is found only in Tanzania. The species is named for German collector and botanist Hans-Joachim Schlieben.

== Description ==
Erythrina schliebenii grows as a tree 5–10 metres (16–33 ft) tall. Terminal leaflets are obtrapeziform and measure 14 centimetres (6 in) wide while the lateral leaflets are rhomboid to ovate and measure up to 14 cm (6 in) long. The leaflets are glabrous above with a few hairs on the undersides. Petioles are prickly and measure up to 20 cm (8 in) long.

Inflorescences are many-flowered with a stalk up to 40 cm (16 in) long. The corolla is brightly coloured orange to red.

== Distribution and habitat ==
Erythrina schliebenii is endemic to Tanzania. The species has a single known population located in forest inland from Kilwa. Its habitat is forest on coral rag at an altitude of around 250 m (800 ft).

== Conservation ==
Hans-Joachim Schlieben collected samples of Erythrina schliebenii in 1934 and 1935. The likely type location of the species, at Lake Lutamba near Lindi, was cleared for a cashew plantation in the 1940s. The species was initially declared extinct in 1998.

In 2001, flowers and leaves of Erythrina schliebenii were collected by the University of Dar es Salaam herbarium in the Namatimbili Forest. However the species was again believed to have become extinct in 2008 when the only known surviving trees fell victim to commercial logging.

A small population of fewer than 50 individual trees was rediscovered in March 2012 during botanical explorations in the south-east of Tanzania, inland from Kilwa. This population grows in rocky areas unsuited to cultivation. However, the area does not have protected status. The species is not known to be harvested but its ecosystem is threatened by developments such as for infrastructure. As of 2012, given the estimated population of from 10 to 50 individuals and the lack of a protected area, the IUCN has assigned Erythrina schliebenii the status of critically endangered.
