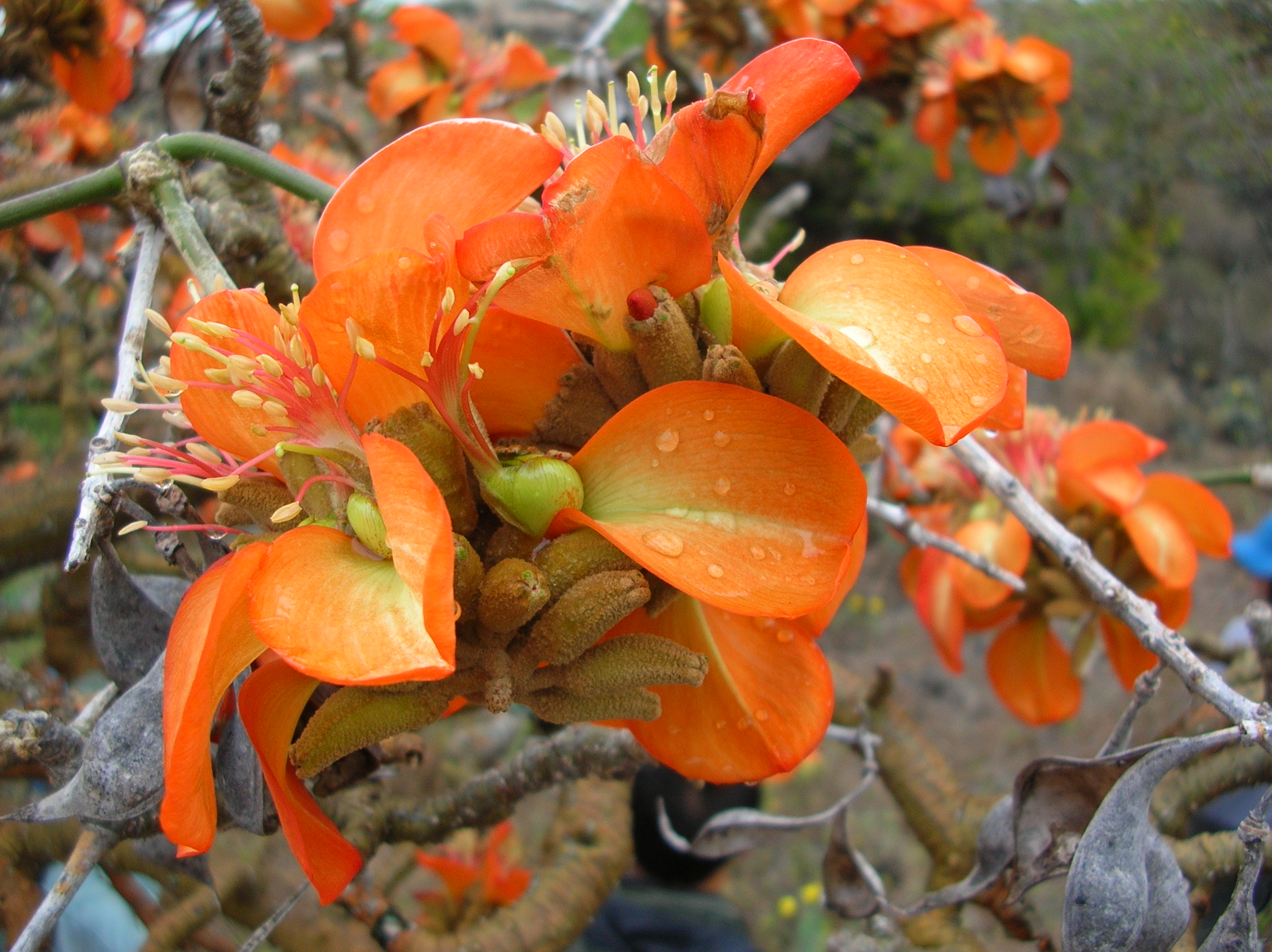
- Wiliwili (E. sandwicensis) flowers, Kanaio Beach, Maui, Hawaii

Scientific classification
- Kingdom: Plantae
- Clade: Tracheophytes
- Clade: Angiosperms
- Clade: Eudicots
- Clade: Rosids
- Order: Fabales
- Family: Fabaceae
- Subfamily: Faboideae
- Tribe: Phaseoleae
- Genus: Erythrina; L. (1753)

Type species
- Erythrina corallodendron L.

Species
- About 130, see text.

Synonyms
- List: Chirocalyx Meisn. (1843); Corallodendron Mill. (1754); Duchassaingia Walp. (1850); Erythina (lapsus); Hypaphorus Hassk. (1858); Macrocymbium Walp. (1853); Micropteryx Walp. (1851); Mouricou Adans. (1763); Stenotropis Hassk. (1855); Tetradapa Osbeck (1757); Xyphanthus Raf. (1817)

= Erythrina =

Coral trees

Genus of plants

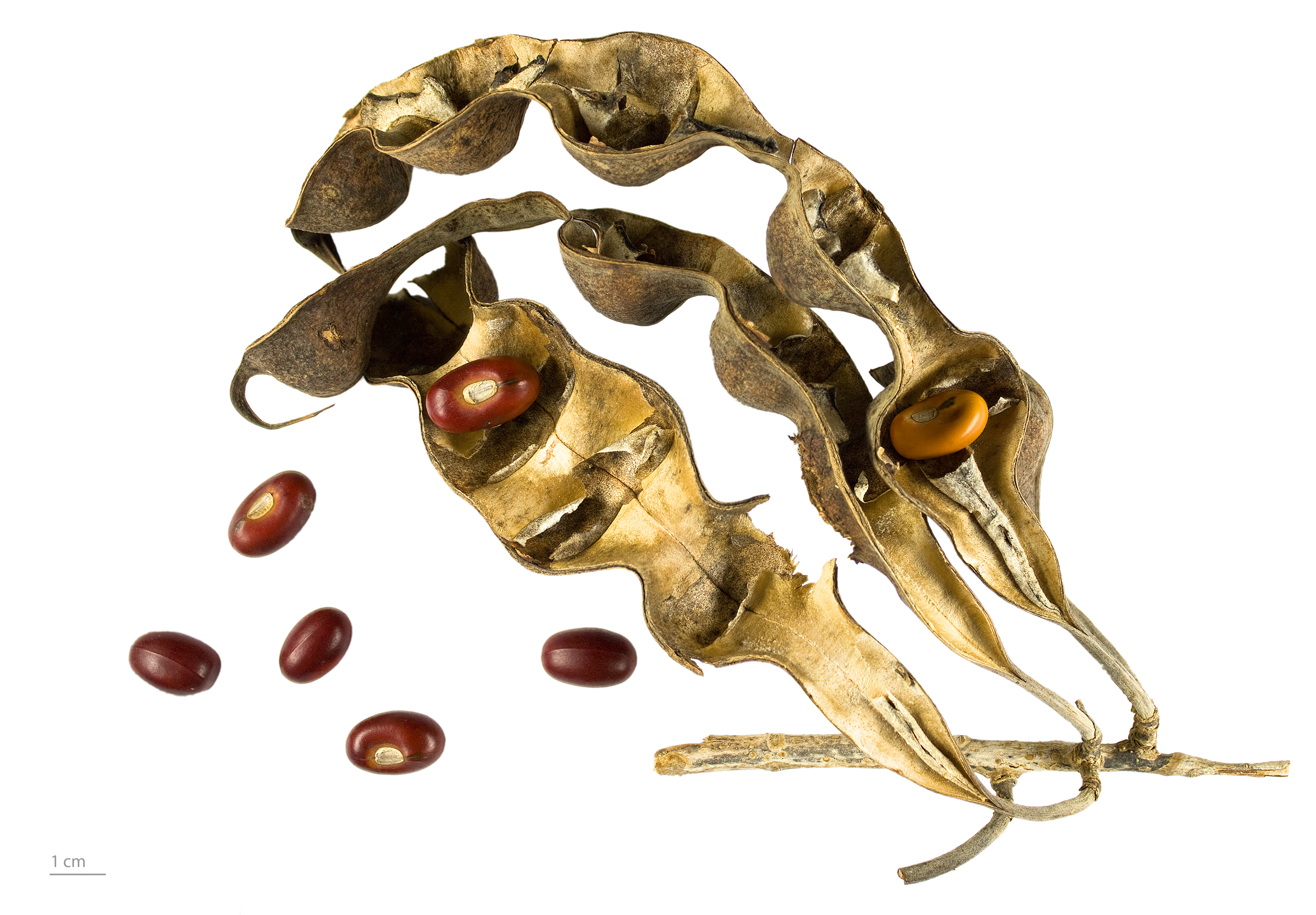
Erythrina flabelliformis - MHNT

Erythrina /ˌɛrɪˈθraɪnə/ is a genus of plants in the pea family, Fabaceae. It contains about 130 species, which are distributed in tropical and subtropical regions worldwide. They are trees, with the larger species growing up to 30 m (98 ft) in height. These species are known for their large flowers with long and bright red or orange petals.

== Taxonomy ==
The generic name is derived from the Greek word ερυθρóς erythros, meaning "red", referring to the flower color of certain species.

=== Common names ===
Particularly in horticulture, the name coral tree is used as a collective term for these plants. Flame tree is another vernacular name, but may refer to a number of unrelated plants as well. Many species of Erythrina have bright red flowers, and this may be the origin of the common name. However, the growth of the branches can resemble the shape of sea coral rather than the color of Corallium rubrum specifically, and this is an alternative source for the name. Other popular names, usually local and particular to distinct species, liken the flowers' red hues to those of a male chicken's wattles, and/or the flower shape to its leg spurs. Commonly seen Spanish names for any local species are bucaré, frejolillo or porotillo, and in Afrikaans some are called kafferboom (from the species name Erythrina affra previously caffra). Mullumurikku is a widespread name in Kerala. Literature on Polynesian species identifies the genus collectively as ngatae or gatae.

== Description ==
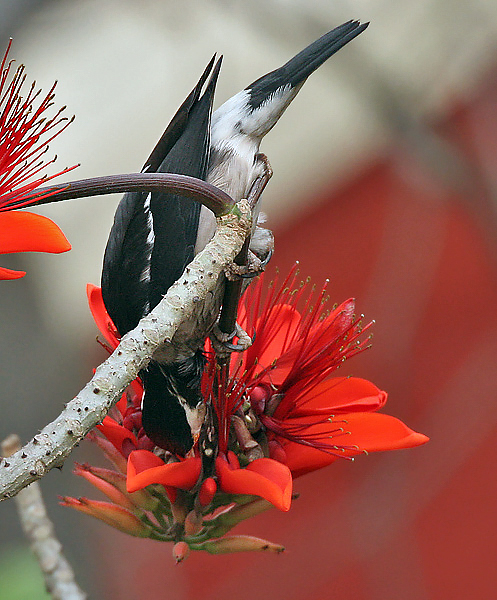
Indian pied myna (Gracupica contra) feeding on Indian coral tree (E. variegata) flowers in Kolkata, India.

A flower of most known Erythrina species is made of long top petals that fold into a boat or spade shape and curve backwards from the stem while the bottom petals enclose its stamens; both together make almost a butterfly shape. Not all of them flower in just bright red; the wiliwili (E. sandwicensis) has extraordinary variation in its flower colour, with orange, yellow, salmon, green and white all being found within natural populations. This striking color polymorphism is also found in Erythrina lysistemon and Erythrina afra.

=== Ecology ===
All species except the sterile hybrids E. × sykesii and E. × bidwillii have legume-type fruit, sometimes called pods, containing one or more seeds. The resilient buoyant seeds are often carried by the sea for large distances and are commonly called "sea beans".

Erythrina leaves are used as food plants by the larvae of some Lepidoptera species including the swift moth Endoclita damor and the woolly bears Hypercompe eridanus and Hypercompe icasia. The mite Tydeus munsteri is a pest on the coastal coral tree (E. afra).

Many birds visit the nectar-rich Erythrina flowers. In the Neotropics, these are usually larger hummingbirds, for example the swallow-tailed hummingbird (Eupetomena macroura) and the black-throated (Anthracothorax nigricollis) and green-breasted mangos (A. prevostii) – though they seem not to be especially fond of E. speciosa at least, which they visit rather opportunistically. In Southeast Asia, the black drongo (Dicrurus macrocercus) which usually does not eat nectar in quantity has been observed feeding on E. suberosa flowers, and mynas and of course more specialized nectar feeders also utilize coral tree flowers. Lorikeets such as the collared lory (Phigys solitarius) and the possibly extinct New Caledonian lorikeet (Charmosyna diadema) are known to consume (or have consumed) large amounts of Erythrina nectar.

== Use by humans ==
Some coral trees are used widely in the tropics and subtropics as street and park trees, especially in drier areas. In some places, such as Venezuela, bucarés are used as shade trees for coffee or cocoa crops. In the Bengal region, they are used for the same purpose in Schumannianthus dichotoma plantations. E. lanceolata in particular is considered highly suitable as "frame" tree for vanilla vines to grow up on.

Native Hawaiians made a number of items from wiliwili wood because of its low density, such as mouo (fishing net floats), ama (outrigger canoe floats, and extremely long papa heʻe nalu (surfboards) called olo. Olo, which averaged 18 feet (5.5 m), were exclusively ridden by aliʻi (royalty). The wood was sometimes used for the waʻa (hull) of outrigger canoes intended to be used near-shore, for recreation, or for training. The shiny orange-red seeds were strung into lei.

The conspicuous, even dramatic coral trees are widely used as floral emblems. cockspur coral tree (E. crista-galli) is the national flower of Argentina and Uruguay. The coastal coral tree (E. afra) is the official city tree of Los Angeles, California, where it is referred to simply as the "coral tree". The state trees of Mérida and Trujillo in Venezuela are bucaré ceibo (E. poeppigiana) and purple coral tree (bucaré anauco, E. fusca), respectively. Yonabaru, Okinawa as well as the Okinawa Prefecture, Quanzhou, Fujian Province and Pathum Thani Province have the Indian coral tree (E. variegata) as floral emblems. Known as thong lang in Thailand, the latter species is also one of the thong ("trees") referred to in the name of Amphoe Chom Thong, Chiang Mai Province. In a similar vein, Zumpahuacán in Mexico derives its name from Nahuatl tzompahuacá, "place of the Erythrina americana".

In Hinduism, the mandāra tree in Indra's garden in Svarga is held to be E. stricta. The same motif is found in Indo-Tibetan Buddhism, where the mandāravā (Tib. man dā ra ba) growing in Sukhāvatī is identified as an Indian coral tree (E. variegata). The concept of the Five Trees of Paradise is also found in Christian Gnosticism. Though as none of the trees is identified as an Erythrina here, the concept might not be as directly related to the Asian religions as some presume.

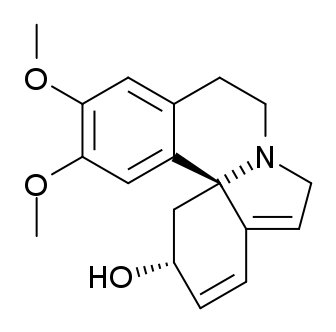
Erythravine is tetrahydroisoquinoline alkaloid from Erythrina mulungu, studied for possible anxiolytic properties.

The seeds of at least one-third of the species contain potent erythrina alkaloids, and some of these are used for medicinal and other purposes by indigenous peoples. They are all toxic to some degree, however, and the seeds of some can cause fatal poisoning. The chemical compounds found in plants in this genus include alkaloids such as scoulerine, erysodin, erysovin (namely in E. flabelliformis), and the putative anxiolytic erythravine (isolated from Mulungu, E. mulungu). Erysodienone is a precursor in the biosynthesis of many of these alkaloids.

=== As food ===
Root tubers of Erythrina species have been traditional food for aborigines of the Northern Territory of Australia.

In Vietnam, people use the leaves of E. variegata to wrap nem chua (a kind of fermented pork wrapped in banana leaves).

== Selected species ==
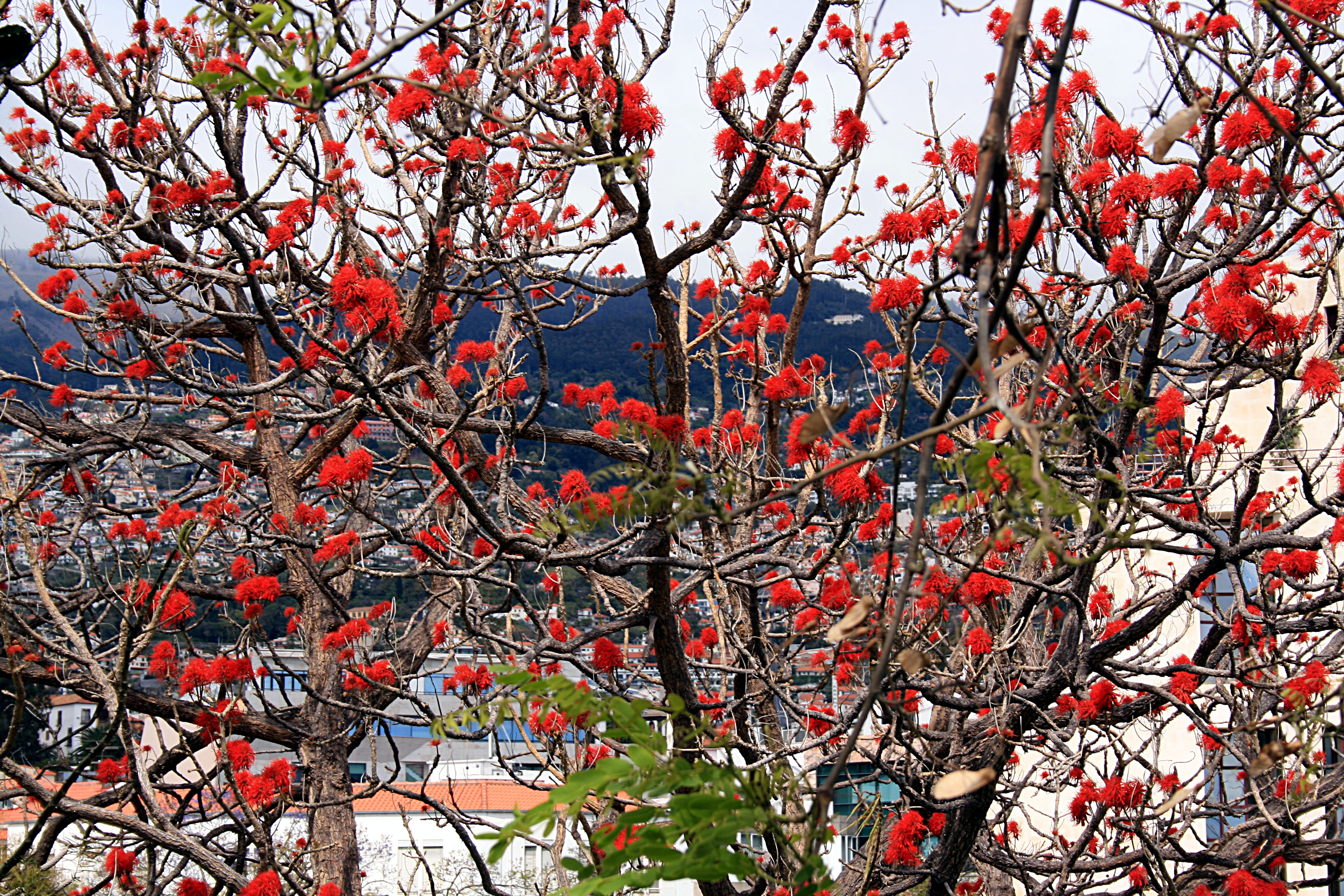
Erythrina abyssinica in flower, Funchal (Madeira)

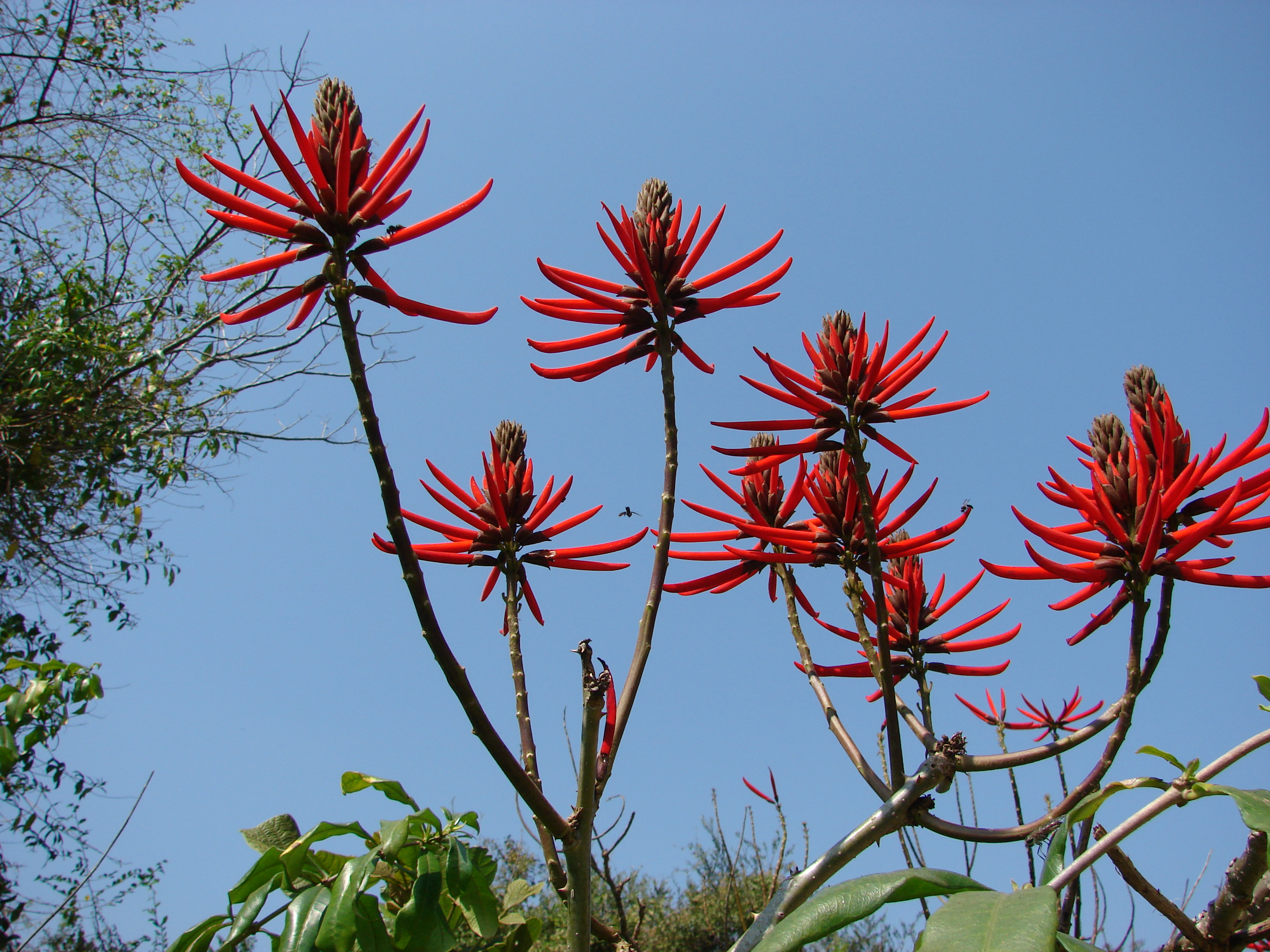
Erythrina speciosa inflorescences, Brazil

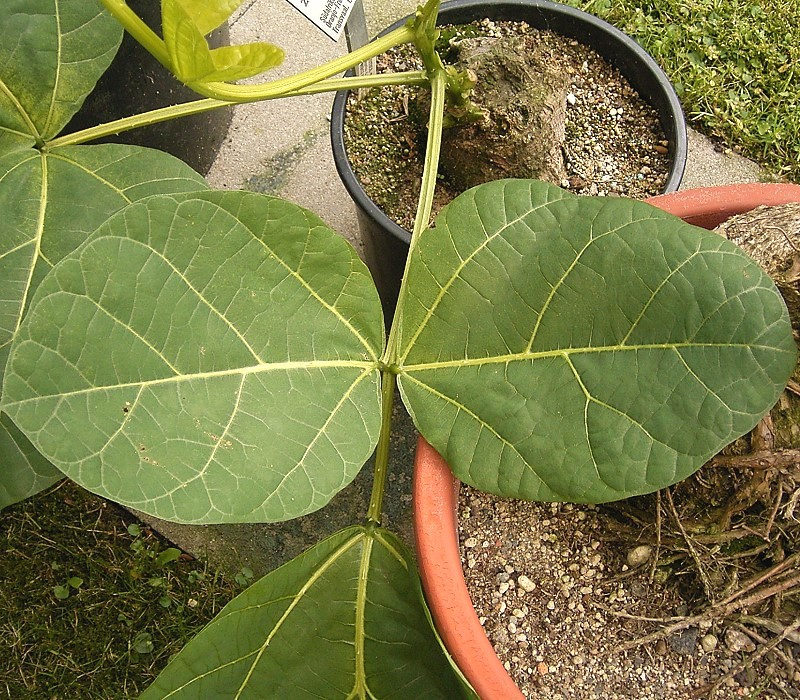
Erythrina zeyheri leaflets

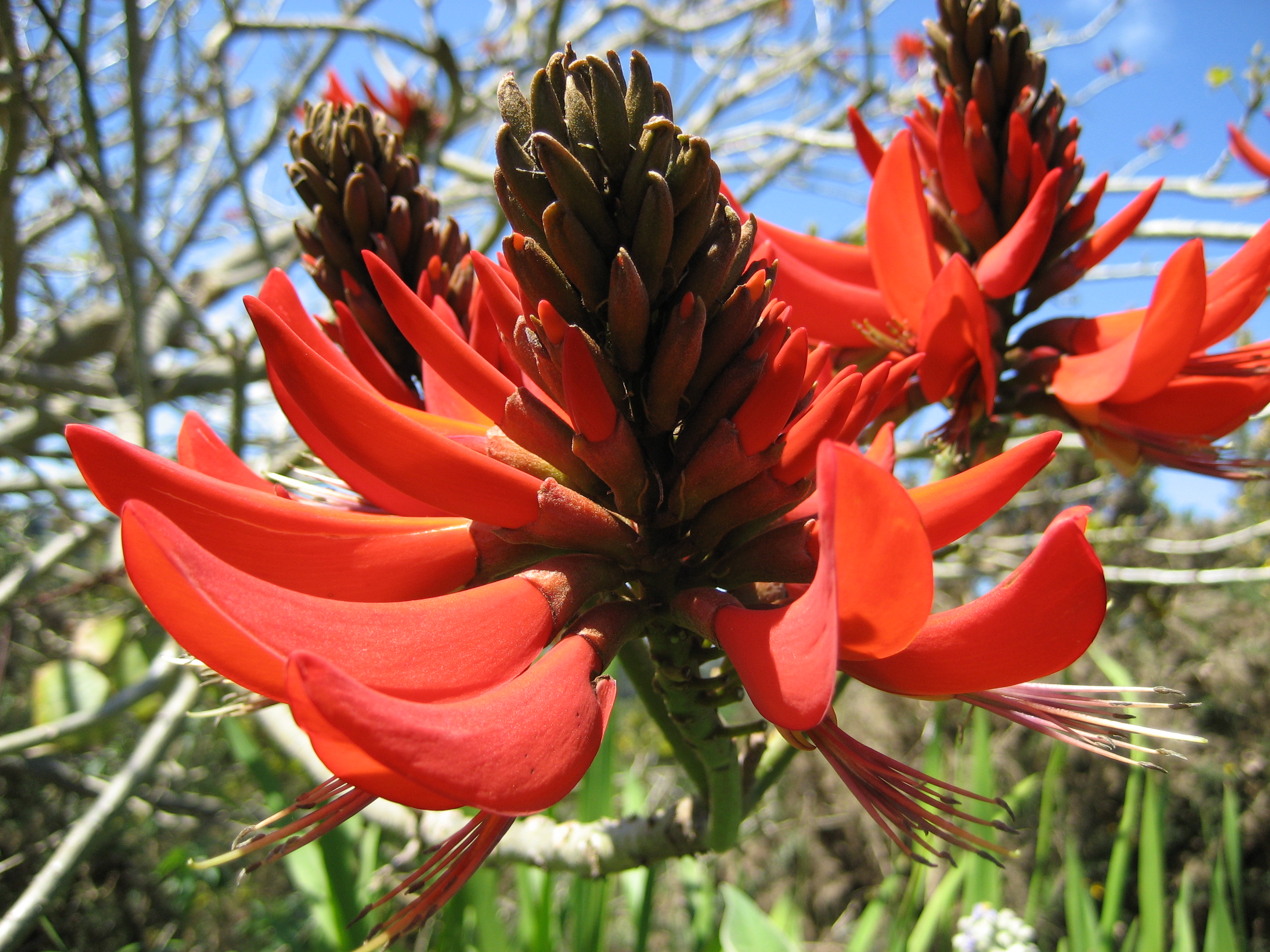
Erythrina ×sykesii in flower, Auckland, New Zealand

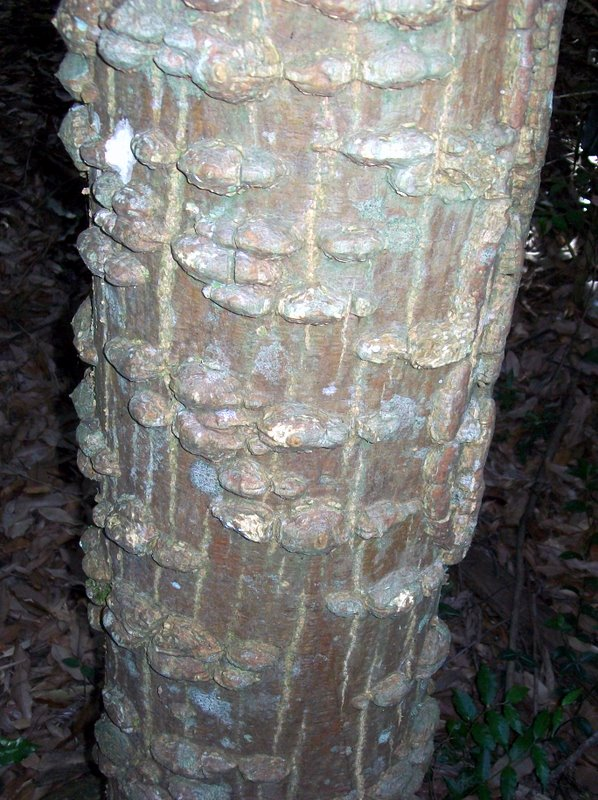
Bark of Erythrina species 'Croftby', Australia

- Erythrina abyssinica Lam. ex DC. (East Africa)
- Erythrina acanthocarpa
- Erythrina afra Thunb. – Coastal coral tree (Southeastern Africa)
- Erythrina americana Mill. – Colorín, Tzompāmitl (Mexico)
- Erythrina ankaranensis Du Puy & Labat (Madagascar)
- Erythrina atitlanensis Krukoff & Barneby
- Erythrina berteroana Urb.
- Erythrina burana Chiov. (Ethiopia)
- Erythrina chiapasana Krukoff
- Erythrina corallodendron L. (Hispaniola, Jamaica)
- Erythrina coralloides D.C. – Flame coral tree, naked coral tree (Arizona in the United States, Mexico)
- Erythrina crista-galli L. – Cockspur coral tree, ceibo, seíbo, bucaré (Argentina, Uruguay, Brazil, Paraguay)
- Erythrina decora Harms
- Erythrina edulis Micheli – Basul (Andes)
- Erythrina eggersii Krukoff & Moldenke – Cock's-spur, espuela de gallo, piñón espinoso (United States Virgin Islands, Puerto Rico)
- Erythrina elenae Howard & Briggs (Cuba)
- Erythrina euodiphylla Hassk. ex Backh. (Indonesia)
- Erythrina falcata Benth. – Brazilian coral tree (Brazil)
- Erythrina flabelliformis Kearney
- Erythrina fusca Lour. – Purple coral tree, bois immortelle, bucaré anauco, bucayo, gallito (Pantropical)
- Erythrina haerdii Verdc. (Tanzania)
- Erythrina hazomboay Du Puy & Labat (Madagascar)
- Erythrina herbacea L. – Coral bean, Cherokee bean, red cardinal, cardinal spear (Southeastern United States, Northeastern Mexico)
- Erythrina humeana Spreng. – Natal coral tree, dwarf coral tree, dwarf kaffirboom, dwarf erythrina (South Africa)
- Erythrina lanceolata Standl.
- Erythrina latissima E.Mey.
- Erythrina leptorhiza Moc. & Sessé ex DC. (Mexico)
- Erythrina lysistemon Hutch. – Common coral tree, Transvaal kaffirboom, lucky bean tree (South Africa)
- Erythrina madagascariensis Du Puy & Labat (Madagascar)
- Erythrina megistophylla (Ecuador)
- Erythrina mexicana (Mexico)
- Erythrina mulungu Diels Mart. – Mulungu (Brazil)
- Erythrina orophila Ghesq.
- Erythrina perrieri R.Viguier (Madagascar)
- Erythrina poeppigiana (Walp.) O.F.Cook – bucare ceibo
- Erythrina polychaeta Harms (Ecuador)
- Erythrina resupinata Roxb (India and Nepal)
- Erythrina rubrinervia Kunth
- Erythrina sacleuxii Hua (Kenya, Tanzania)
- Erythrina sandwicensis O.Deg. – Wiliwili (Hawaii)
- Erythrina schimpffii Diels (Ecuador)
- Erythrina schliebenii Harms – Lake Latumba Erythrina (Thought to be extinct since 1938, but some individuals, believed to be less than fifty, were recently rediscovered in forest remnants on rocky sites in coastal Tanzania (reported in the UK Guardian newspaper 23 March 2012, from a report in the Journal of East African Natural History.)
- Erythrina senegalensis DC.
- Erythrina speciosa Andrews (Brazil)
- Erythrina standleyana Krukoff (Mexico to Guatemala, western Cuba)
- Erythrina stricta Roxb. – Mandara (Southeast Asia)
- Erythrina suberosa Roxb.
- Erythrina subumbrans Miq.
- Erythrina tahitensis Nadeaud (Tahiti)
- Erythrina tholloniana Hua (West-Central Tropical Africa)
- Erythrina tuxtlana Krukoff & Barneby (Mexico)
- Erythrina variegata L. – Indian coral tree, tiger's claw, sunshine tree, roluos tree (Cambodia), deigo (Okinawa), drala (Fiji), madar (Bangladesh), man da ra ba (Tibet), thong lang (Thailand), vông nem (Vietnam)
- Erythrina velutina Willd. (Caribbean, South America, Galápagos Islands)
- Erythrina vespertilio Benth. – Bat's wing coral tree, grey corkwood, "bean tree" (Australia)
- Erythrina zeyheri Harv. – Ploughbreaker

Horticultural hybrids:

- Erythrina × bidwillii Lindl.
- Erythrina × sykesii Barneby & Krukoff

=== Formerly placed here ===
- Butea monosperma (Lam.) Taub. (as E. monosperma Lam.)
- Piscidia piscipula (L.) Sarg (as E. piscipula L.)

== Legal status ==
=== United States ===
==== Louisiana ====
Growing, selling or possessing Erythrina spp. except for ornamental purposes, is prohibited by Louisiana State Act 159 (where the genus is misspelled Erythina); the Act covers various known, suspected, or rumored hallucinogenic plants.

== See also ==
- Mandarava
- Psychedelic plants
- Victor A. Reko
