= Erythrina tuxtlana =

Conservation status
- Vulnerable (IUCN 2.3)

Scientific classification
- Kingdom: Plantae
- Clade: Tracheophytes
- Clade: Angiosperms
- Clade: Eudicots
- Clade: Rosids
- Order: Fabales
- Family: Fabaceae
- Subfamily: Faboideae
- Genus: Erythrina
- Species: E. tuxtlana

Binomial name
- Erythrina tuxtlana Krukoff & Barneby

Species of legume

Erythrina tuxtlana is a species of legume in the family Fabaceae. It is found only in Mexico.
