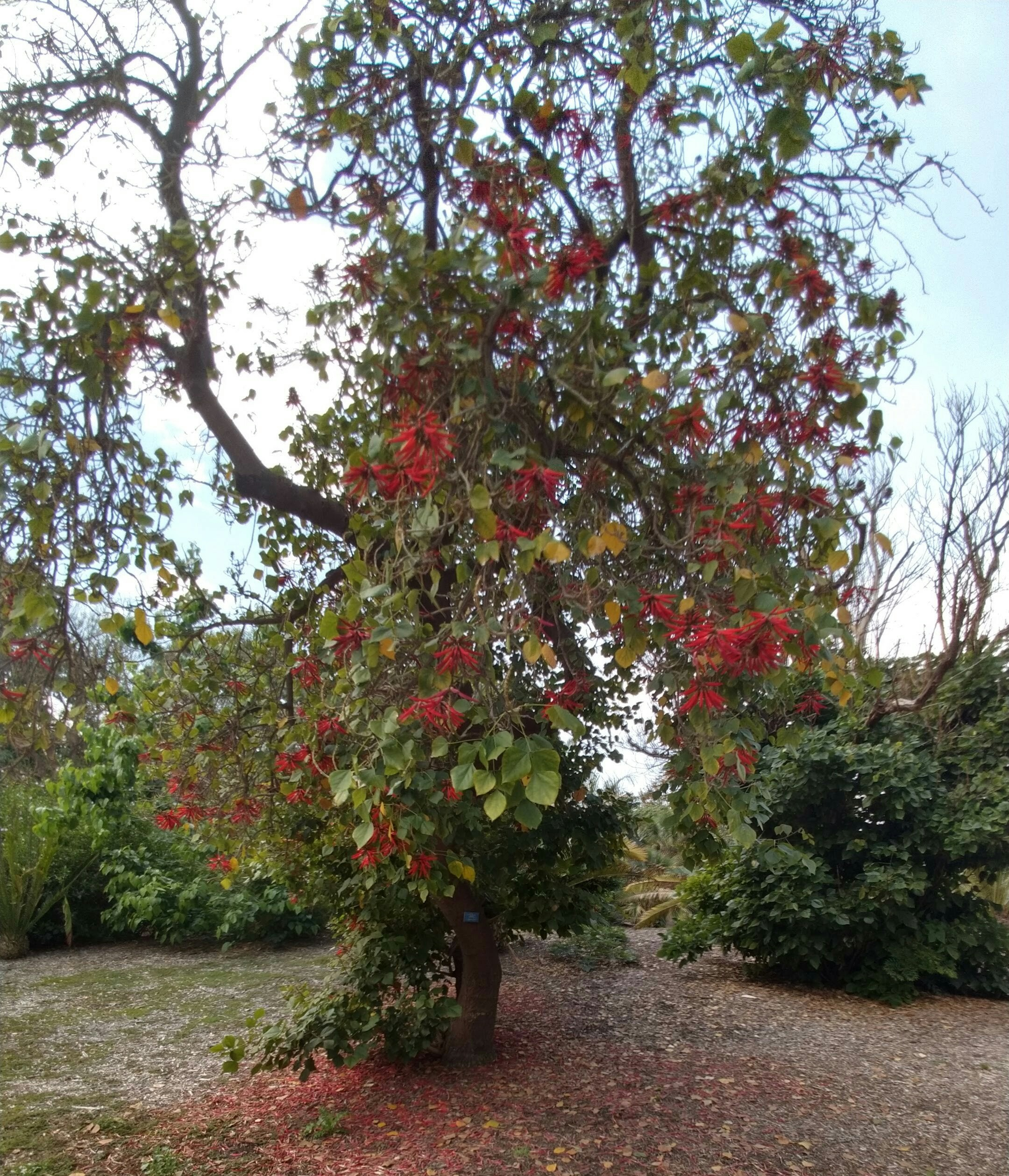

Scientific classification
- Kingdom: Plantae
- Clade: Tracheophytes
- Clade: Angiosperms
- Clade: Eudicots
- Clade: Rosids
- Order: Fabales
- Family: Fabaceae
- Subfamily: Faboideae
- Genus: Erythrina
- Species: E. chiapasana

Binomial name
- Erythrina chiapasana Krukoff

= Erythrina chiapasana =

Species of plant

Erythrina chiapasana is a perennial woody plant in the family Fabaceae. It has a native range from South Mexico to Guatemala. Its name relates to Chiapas, Southern Mexico.

== Bibliography ==
- "Erythrina chiapasana Krukoff". Smithsonian Institution.
