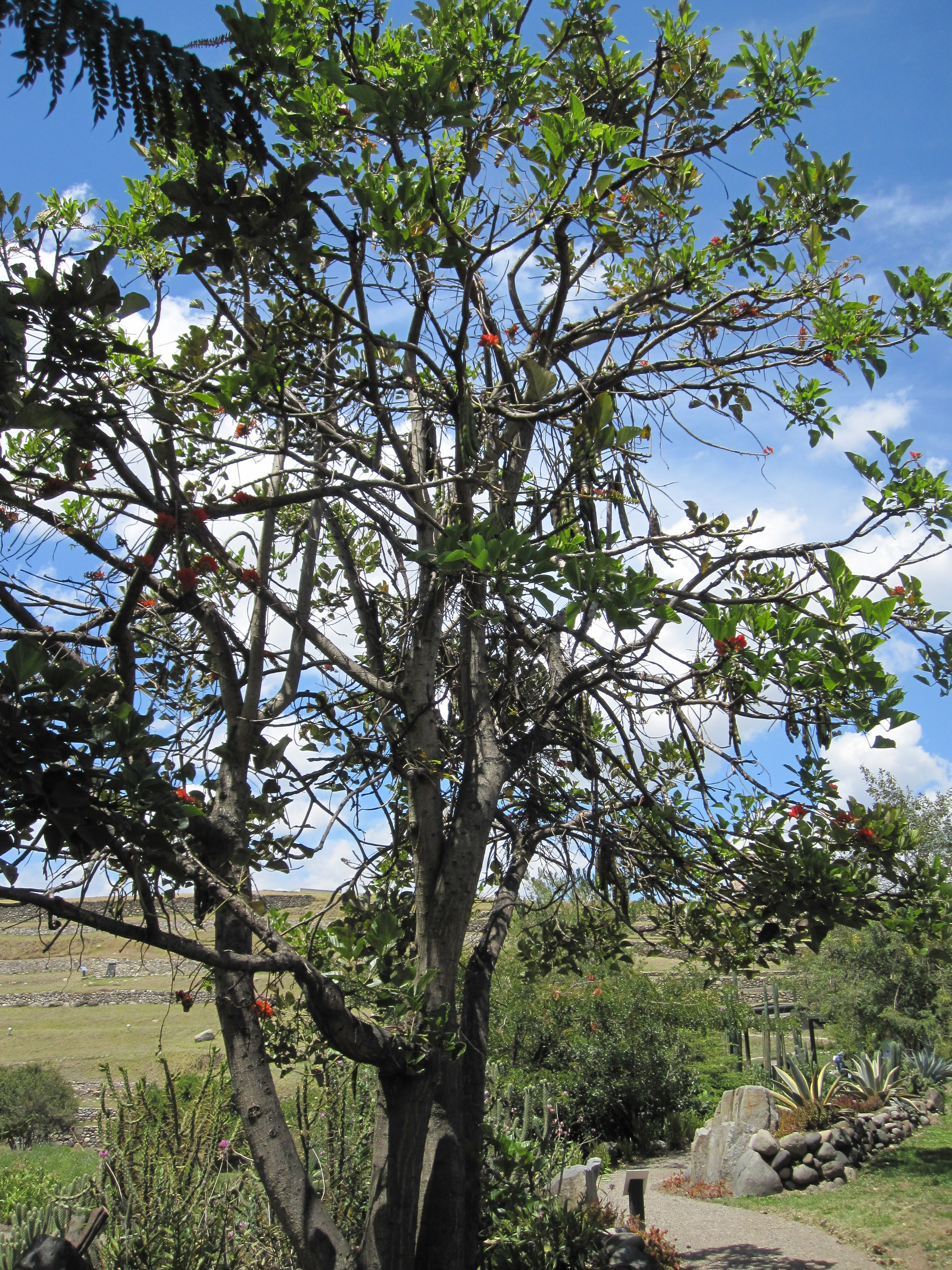

Scientific classification
- Kingdom: Plantae
- Clade: Embryophytes
- Clade: Tracheophytes
- Clade: Angiosperms
- Clade: Eudicots
- Clade: Rosids
- Order: Fabales
- Family: Fabaceae
- Subfamily: Faboideae
- Genus: Erythrina
- Species: E. edulis

Binomial name
- Erythrina edulis Triana ex Micheli

= Erythrina edulis =

Species of tree

Erythrina edulis (basul) is a Andean tree species. It is nitrogen fixing and potentially useful in agroforestry, but is not commonly cultivated. It is a legume, producing protein-rich beans pods that can be used for human or animal nutrition.

== Distribution and habitat ==
It is native to the Andean region from western Venezuela to southern Bolivia.

== Cultivation ==
Erythrina edulis is a vigorous, fast-growing precocious legume species, and is considered one of the easiest trees to grow. As it is sensitive to the cold, it grows only in the tropics and is not suitable for temperate regions. Optimum temperatures are between 15 and 22 °C (59 and 72 °F), and it grows in a broad range of altitudes, from 900 to 3,200 m (3,000 to 10,500 ft) above sea level. In its native habitat, the average annual precipitation varies between 450 and 1,800 mm (18 and 71 in). It grows best in well-drained soils with a sandy or clayey texture and a pH ranging from 5.5 to 7.

Erythrina edulis is a totipotent plant and thus propagates easily. Hence, stems can be cut and planted into the soil and will sprout. Propagation can also be achieved by planting mature seeds and in most cases they germinate easily. Grafting is another possibility; the advantage is that seed production will start earlier. The seeds must be planted very soon after harvesting because they lose their viability 8 days after harvesting. The viability can be extended to 20 days when the seeds are covered in a thin paraffin layer. Erythrina edulis produces a raceme of red flowers, which are pollinated by bees, wasps and birds. The ripening of the seeds is not synchronized.

The tree can live for decades and the older it gets, the more grain it will produce. A three- to four-year-old tree can produce about 30 kg (66 lb) of grain per year, while a 20-year-old tree reaches 120 to 210 kg (260 to 460 lb) of grain per year. Thanks to the symbiosis with Rhizobium bacteria, E. edulis can fix atmospheric nitrogen and therefore does not need any additional nitrogen fertilizer.

=== Agricultural importance ===
Erythrina edulis is a suitable crop for agroforestry. Thanks to nitrogen fixation, other crops included in an intercropping system with E. edulis benefit from higher nitrogen content in the soil, and the tree has potential to make wasteland more productive. E. edulis can produce food during scarcity, because the seeds are normally ripe when the previous year's stocks are exhausted but when it is still too early for the new harvest. The trees can be grown in association with other cash crops as sugar cane, coffee and cacao. A basul tree can grow to 8–14 m (26–46 ft). As it provides shade, the tree can serve to protect sun-sensitive crops from strong radiation. This association is beneficial not only for the sun-sensitive crop but also for basul, since it is less harmed by pests when grown in association with other plants, compared to a monoculture. Combinations with coffee, cacao, pepper, betel and grape have been observed.

Because of the advantages of spatial diversity and the sustainability of agroforestry systems, this form of cultivation continues to gain importance. Little is known about E. edulis, even in the origin region, apart from some rural areas of Colombia.

=== Future improvements ===
The tree does not have a particular harvest time. The harvest times vary for each tree, even between trees grown in the same location. The grain is often used when other food is scarce, for instance during the rainy season. This is good for small farmers who only use the products from their own farm for feeding their family and animals, but not for breeding. One goal is to synchronize the harvest time of all the seeds in one cultivar.

Another goal is to find a solution for the storage problem. The seeds cannot be stored due to the high water content, so finding or developing a cultivar with a lower water content in the seeds has value. Presently this problem is avoided by making flour from the seeds very soon after harvesting. Also the viability of the seeds needs to be improved.

Erythrina edulis is not produced on a large scale yet, but the tree has potential for small-scale farmers because of its different uses. In South America, and as well in the rest of the world, few crops are cultivated and used as both food and fodder sources like E. edulis.

Future research is needed in agroforestry.

== Uses ==
Basul can be used as a food source for humans and animals. The tree carries pods with grains. The length of these pods varies between 15 and 65 cm (6 and 26 in), with an average around 32 cm (13 in). The green pods can be eaten, but it is more common to eat the mature grains. Every pod contains 6 grains, which are 1.4–6.4 cm (1/2–2 1/2 in) long and have a weight between 15–30 g (0.5–1.1 oz). The fresh grains have a high water content, around 80%. Due to this water content, the grains cannot be stored very well. On dry matter basis, the grains have a protein content between 18 and 23%. The protein is composed like protein in most legumes, with a high lysine content and lower concentrations of sulfur-containing amino acids (methionine and cysteine) and tryptophan. The grains also contain a high amount of starch (26-40%). The amino acid pattern of the seeds of E. edulis forms a good complement to cereals and tubers.

To use the grains in human food, they need to be boiled or fried for at least 45 minutes. If the grains are eaten raw frequently, they can be toxic because they contain some alkaloids. All the other Erythrina species contain much more alkaloids and are thus much more toxic. Some of these species resemble E. edulis; the difference is clear for a trained eye, but less experienced people should be careful with harvesting and eating the beans.

The cooked beans can be used in soups, cakes, salads, tortillas etc. They can be dried after the boiling process, ground and used as flour for different purposes. The grains are not yet very common. Usage is typically limited to periods when other food supplies are scarce, but the South American governments are advertising E. edulis in the Andes. For example, they distribute recipes to raise awareness of this possible food source. Additionally, the Colombian government has tried to conserve these beans in cans with the aim to provide an opportunity to store them longer and to open the export market.

The leaves, seeds, and pods can all be used as animal fodder. The leaves have a high protein content (around 24%), and are rich in potassium and poor in calcium. When the pods and grains are used as fodder for chickens, fish, pigs or rabbits, they need to be boiled first, otherwise they can be toxic because of the alkaloids. The boiling process is not necessary when the pods and grains are fed to goats and cattle.

It can also be used as a fence plant.

== Regional names ==
Nowadays it is known in Venezuela as "frijol mompás", in Bolivia, Peru and Northwest Argentina as "psonay", "pajuro", "sachaporoto del basul" or "poroto del sacha", in Colombia as "chachafruto", "balú", "baluy" or "sachaporoto" and in Ecuador as "guato".
