= Erythrina perrieri =

Conservation status
- Endangered (IUCN 3.1)

Scientific classification
- Kingdom: Plantae
- Clade: Tracheophytes
- Clade: Angiosperms
- Clade: Eudicots
- Clade: Rosids
- Order: Fabales
- Family: Fabaceae
- Subfamily: Faboideae
- Genus: Erythrina
- Species: E. perrieri

Binomial name
- Erythrina perrieri R.Vig.

Species of legume

Erythrina perrieri is a species of legume in the family Fabaceae. It is a deciduous tree endemic to Madagascar. It is known from three locations – two on the Ankarana Massif of Diana Region at the island's north end, and one on the Ankara Plateau in Boeny Region 550 km to the southwest where the type specimen was collected. It grows in dry woodland on limestone rocks from 210 to 310 meters elevation.

The species was first described by René Viguier in 1952.
