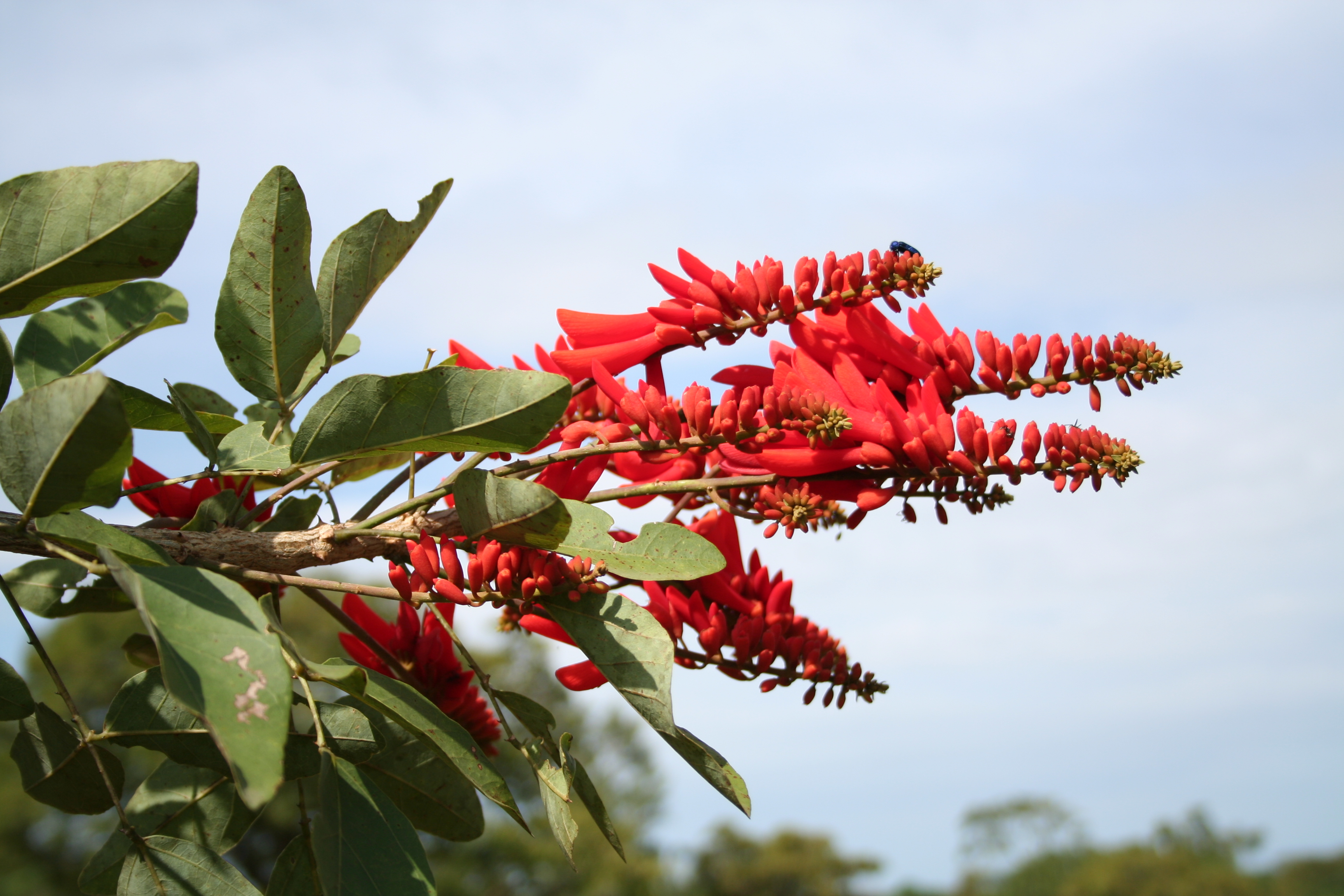

Conservation status
- Least Concern (IUCN 3.1)

Scientific classification
- Kingdom: Plantae
- Clade: Tracheophytes
- Clade: Angiosperms
- Clade: Eudicots
- Clade: Rosids
- Order: Fabales
- Family: Fabaceae
- Subfamily: Faboideae
- Genus: Erythrina
- Species: E. senegalensis

Binomial name
- Erythrina senegalensis DC.

Synonyms
- Chirocalyx latifolius (Schumach. & Thonn.) Walp.; Corallodendron senegalense (DC.) Kuntze; Erythrina guineensis G.Don; Erythrina latifolia Schumach. & Thonn.; Macrocymbium vogelii Walp.

= Erythrina senegalensis =

Species of plant

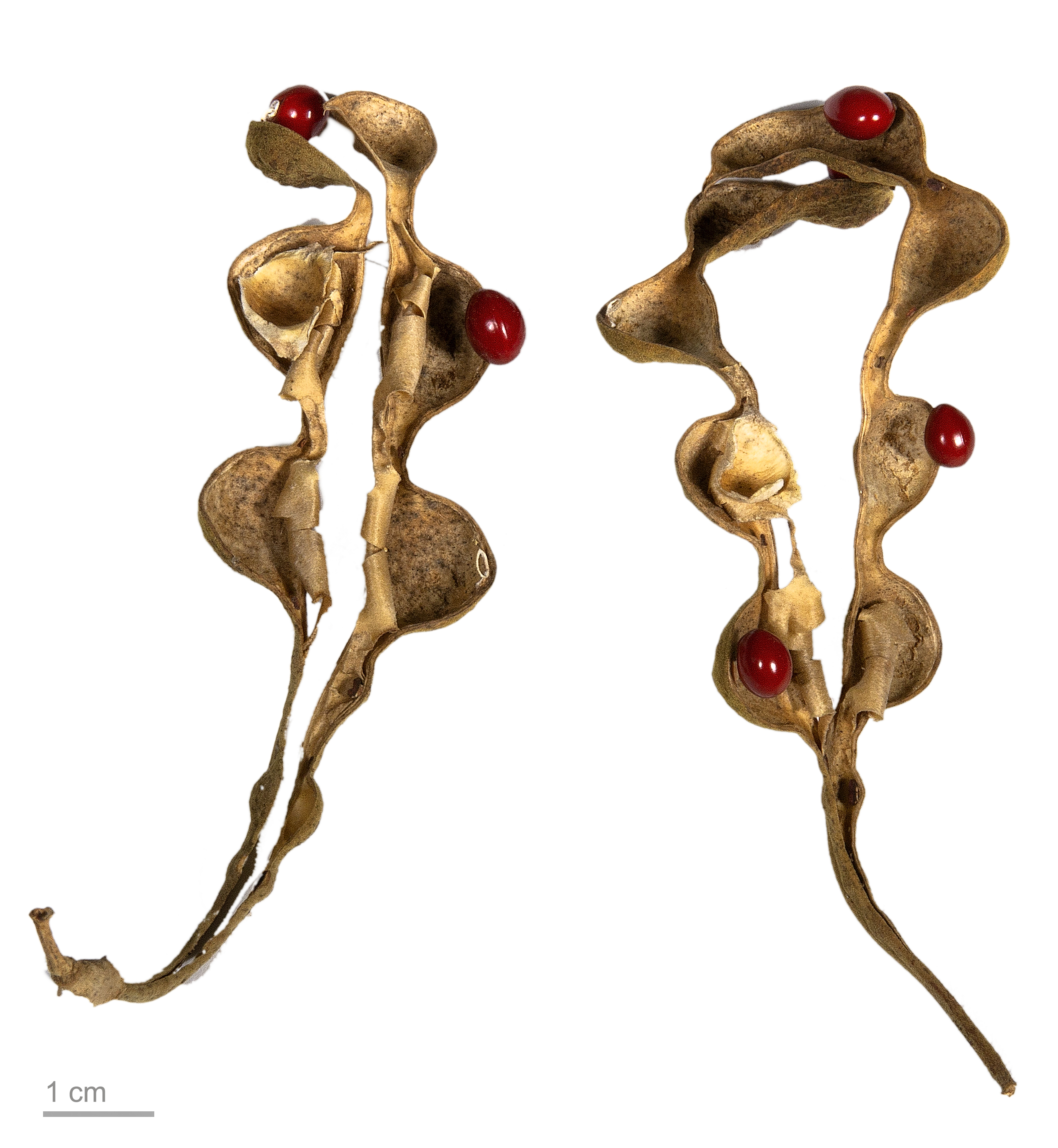
Erythrina senegalensis MHNT

Erythrina senegalensis, the Senegal coraltree, is a plant in the pea family Fabaceae, native to West Africa.

== Description ==
Erythrina senegalensis grows as a tree up to 7 metres (23 ft) tall, rarely to 15 m (50 ft). The bark is fissured. The leaves are composed of three leaflets which measure up to 15 cm (6 in) long, on a thorny stalk. Inflorescences have many flowers with bright red petals. The seeds are poisonous.

== Distribution and habitat ==
Erythrina senegalensis is native to West Africa, across the region from Mauritania to Chad and Cameroon. Its habitat is in wooded grassland or savanna.

== Uses ==
Erythrina senegalensis is locally used in traditional medicine. The wood is locally used to make knife handles and the seeds to make necklaces. The species is cultivated as an ornamental and also used in hedges.
