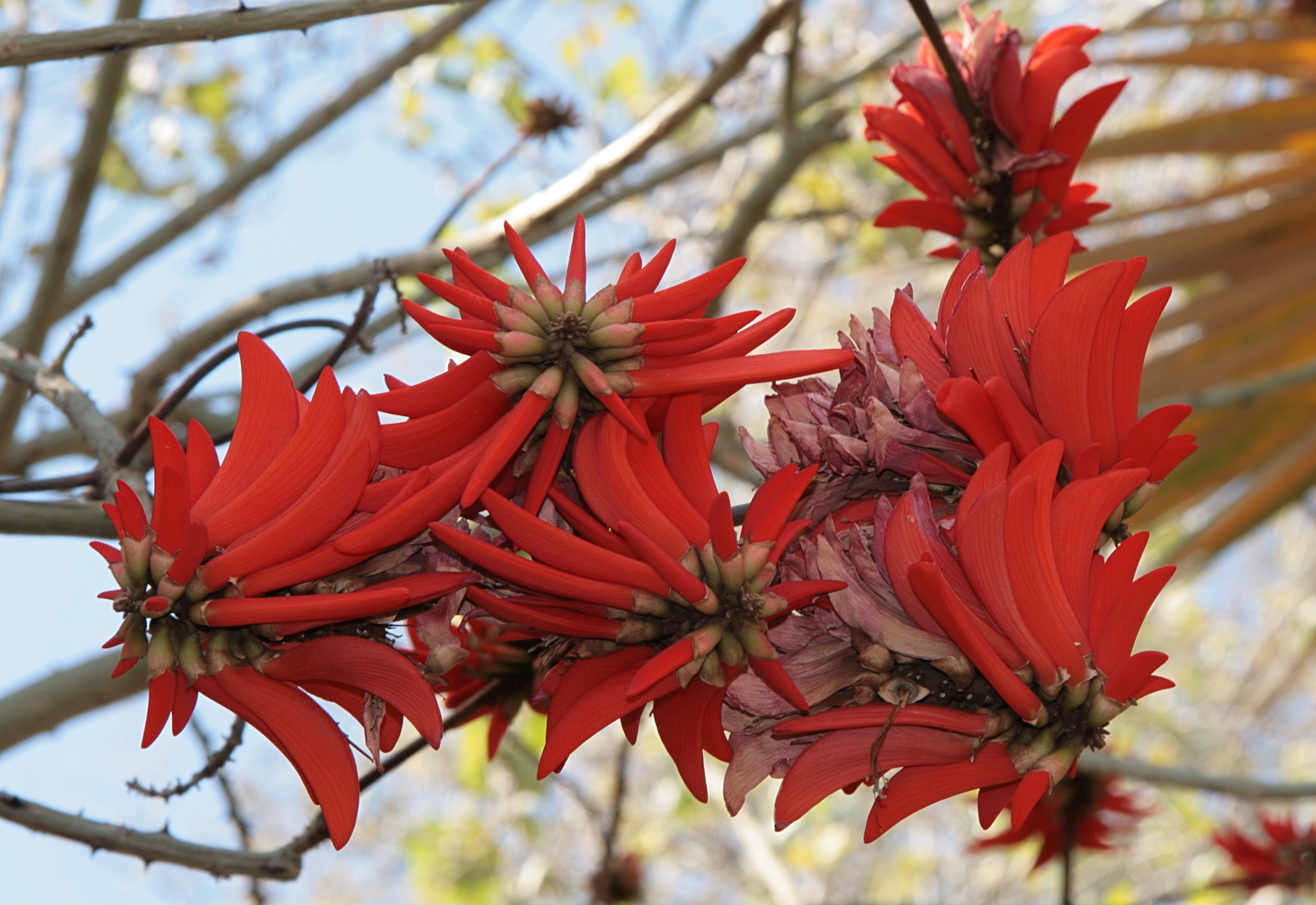
- Flowers
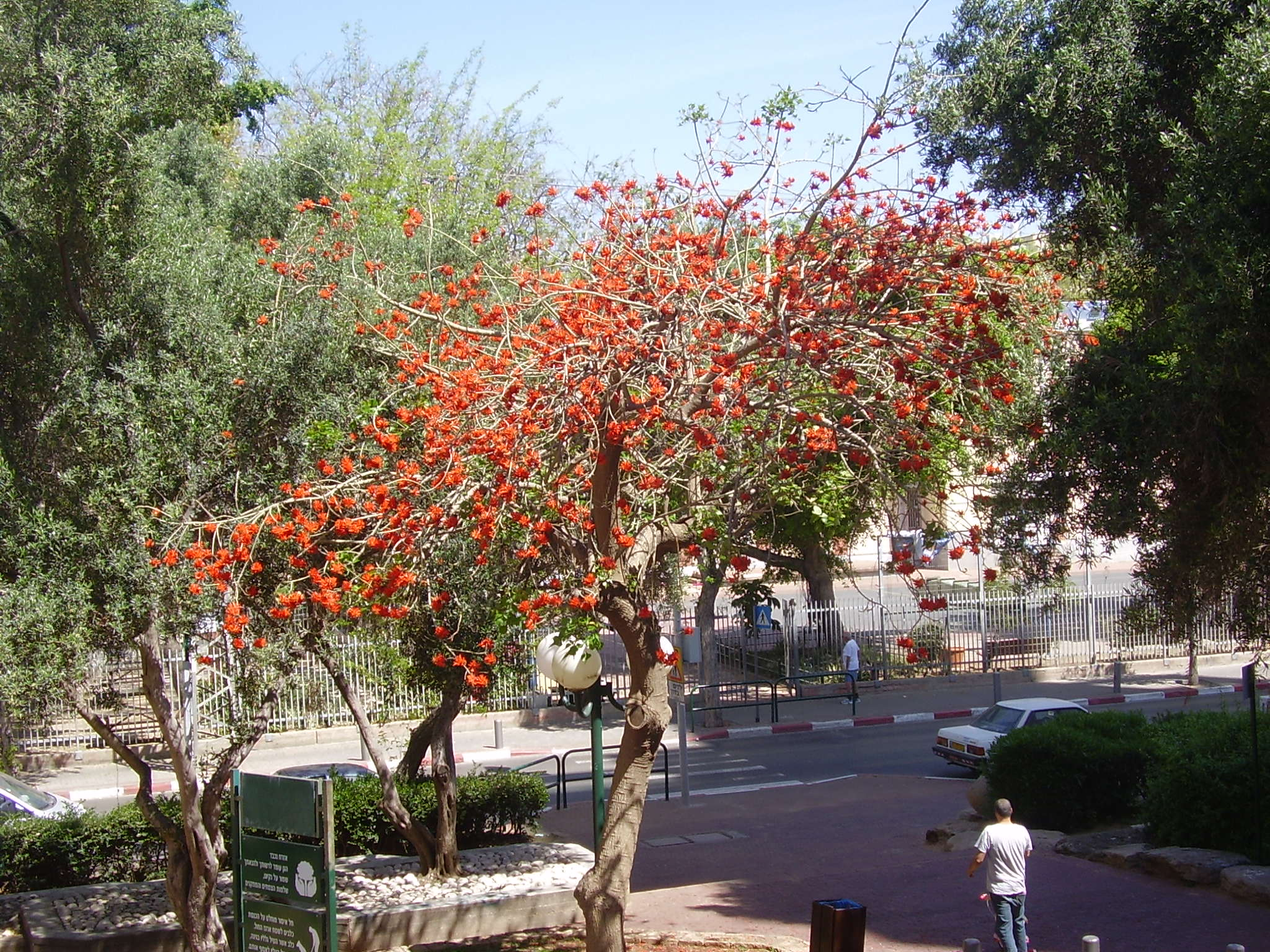
- In a park in Palestine

Scientific classification
- Kingdom: Plantae
- Clade: Embryophytes
- Clade: Tracheophytes
- Clade: Angiosperms
- Clade: Eudicots
- Clade: Rosids
- Order: Fabales
- Family: Fabaceae
- Subfamily: Faboideae
- Genus: Erythrina
- Species: E. corallodendron

Binomial name
- Erythrina corallodendron L.

Synonyms
- List: Corallodendron aculeatum Medik.; Corallodendron australe Kuntze; Corallodendron occidentale (L.) Kuntze; Erythrina corallifera Salisb.; Erythrina corallodendron var. bicolor Krukoff; Erythrina corallodendron var. connata Krukoff; Erythrina corallodendron var. occidentalis L.; Erythrina inermis Mill.; Erythrina spinosa Mill.; Piscidia corallodendrum Steud.

= Erythrina corallodendron =

Species of flowering plant

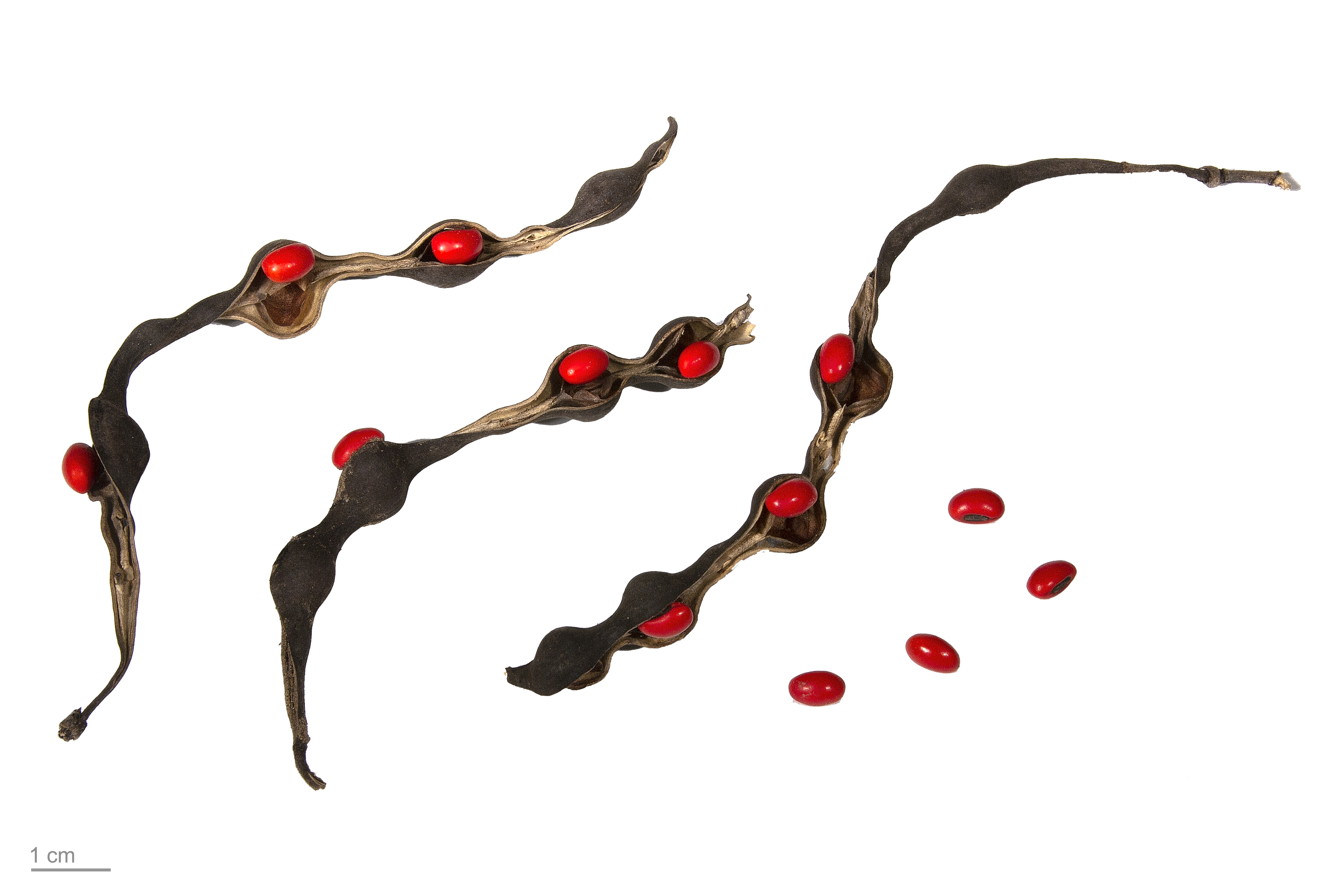
Erythrina corallodendron MHNT

Erythrina corallodendron, the red bean tree, is a species of flowering plant in the family Fabaceae. It is native to the Caribbean; Jamaica, Hispaniola, Puerto Rico, the Leeward Islands, and the Windward Islands, and has been introduced to Trinidad and Tobago, Kenya, Réunion, and the Malay Peninsula. A small tree usually 3 m (10 ft) tall, but rarely reaching 10 m (33 ft), and with showy flowers, it is often planted as an ornamental.
