= Erythrina alkaloids =

Plant-derived bioactive compounds

Erythrina alkaloids, generally containing benzyl-tetrahydroisoquinoline structure, are widely distributed in Erythrina species, a genus of plants which belong to the Fabaceae family in tropical and subtropical regions. The Erythrina alkaloids can be found in several organs of Erythrina trees but are primarily found in their seeds. They display several unique properties, and are the subject of active scientific research relating to their synthesis and bioactivity.

Two kinds of alkaloids are isolated from the Erythrina plants. One is Erythrina alkaloid, the other one is HomoErythrina alkaloid. The shared feature of Erythrina alkaloids is the Erythrinane skeleton, which is a tetracyclic spiroamine structure containing 4 rings, labeled A, B, C and D, respectively.

== Structure ==
The skeletal structures of both Erythrina and HomoErythrina alkaloid contain 4 rings. The D ring is generally aromatic. It can be benzene or heterocyclic ring. The difference between Erythrina and HomoErythrina alkaloids is the C ring's member amount. The configuration of the 5-carbon is always S in all known isolated alkaloids. Some of the Erythrina alkaloids have 3-alkyloxy substituents on A ring, and the configuration of 3-carbon is always R. But in HomoErythrina alkaloids, it varies between R and S at 3-carbon. The Erythrina alkaloids have three basic categories: dienoid, alkenoid and lactonic alkaloids. Some other different types of Erythrina alkaloids are also reported but they are relatively rare. Generally, Alkenoid and Dienoid alkaloids are more common and widely researched in synthesis and pharmacology studies. Some other special Erythrina and HomoErythrina alkaloids are also identified, and they have generally lactonic and pyridine D rings. Scientists are researching the properties of these alkaloids, mostly to see if there are potential applications on neuroscience.

The Erythina alkaloids include, among others erysodine, erytharbin, erythrartine and erysotramidine.

Erysodine

Erytharbin

Erythrartine

(+)-Erysotramidine

== Isolation and synthesis ==
From early research in 1930s of the American biochemist Karl Folkers, it was believed that Erythrina plant's seeds extracts have curare-like action. Other works had shown that the alkaloids could show antiepileptic, anticonvulsant and tranquilizing effects. Some alkaloids with particular bioactivities like Erythraline, plenty of them were first isolated and identified by Venancio Deulofeu in 1947. Even Karl Folkers isolated Erysodine and Erysopine in 1940, but some other free alkaloids still existed in the Erythrina seeds extract mixture. A considerable amount of Erythrina alkaloids were found to be competitive neuronal nicotinic acetylcholine receptors antagonists. Thus, the structures and properties of the alkaloids do inspire new drug development. Till now, 143 compounds in the family are identified from Erythrina.

=== Biosynthesis ===
The biosynthesis pathway of this kind of alkaloid and derivatives was first proposed by D. H. R. Barton and his colleagues in 1968. They had proposed a key 9-membered ring intermediate. They produce erysodienone as the primary Erythrinan derivative. Using the precursor, other kinds of Erythrina alkaloids are produced. Later on, M. H. Zenk revised it and confirmed the 9-membered ring is the biosynthetic pathway in 1999. The biosynthetic pathway showed the precursor of the key intermediate erysodienone had a structure like dopamine, which also can suggest the metabolism was highly related to dopamine, a key signaling molecule in neural system.

=== Chemical synthesis inspired by biosynthesis ===
The pathway had inspired some synthetic chemistry researchers' work to synthesize few other alkaloids in the family. Few works have been reported as the biosynthetic pathway was revealed. In 2016, T. Fukuyama's group developed a concise route to synthesize several Erythrina alkaloids, including erythraline and erystamidine. In fact, since most of the alkenoids and dienoids share the same skeletal structure, the approach can easily get most of the alkaloids with substrate adjustments.

== Bioactivities ==
In 2013, Tadahiro Etoh and Yong Pil Kim found that transforming growth factor (TGF)-β-activated kinase (TAK1) was one of the target molecules of erythraline likely involved in its anti-inflammatory effect. Therefore, erythraline may show the effect on inflammatory diseases, such as rheumatism and hepatitis, through inhibition of TAK1.

Still, few alkaloids showed selectivity for b2-containing nAChRs, particularly thea4b2 subtype. W. P. Santos has reported in vitro and ex vivo anti-cholinesterase activities of Erythrina velutina leaf extracts, containing a relatively high fraction of the alkaloids. Aqueous extract and alkaloids rich extract crossed the blood-brain barrier to inhibit cholinesterase activity in the brain. Aqueous extract and alkaloids rich extract also exhibited a dual inhibitory action on acetylcholinesterase and butyrylcholinesterase.

M. M. Mohammed's research in 2012 found that crude alkaloidal fraction caused a reduction in the viability of mock-infected MT-4 cells with a CC_{50} of 53 μM and a 50% protection of MT-4 cells against HIV-1 induced cytopathogenicity with an EC_{50} of >53 μM, compared with EFV as a positive control, which had a CC_{50} of 45 μM and an EC_{50} of 0.003 μM.
