= Bark (botany) =

Outermost layers of stems and roots of woody plants

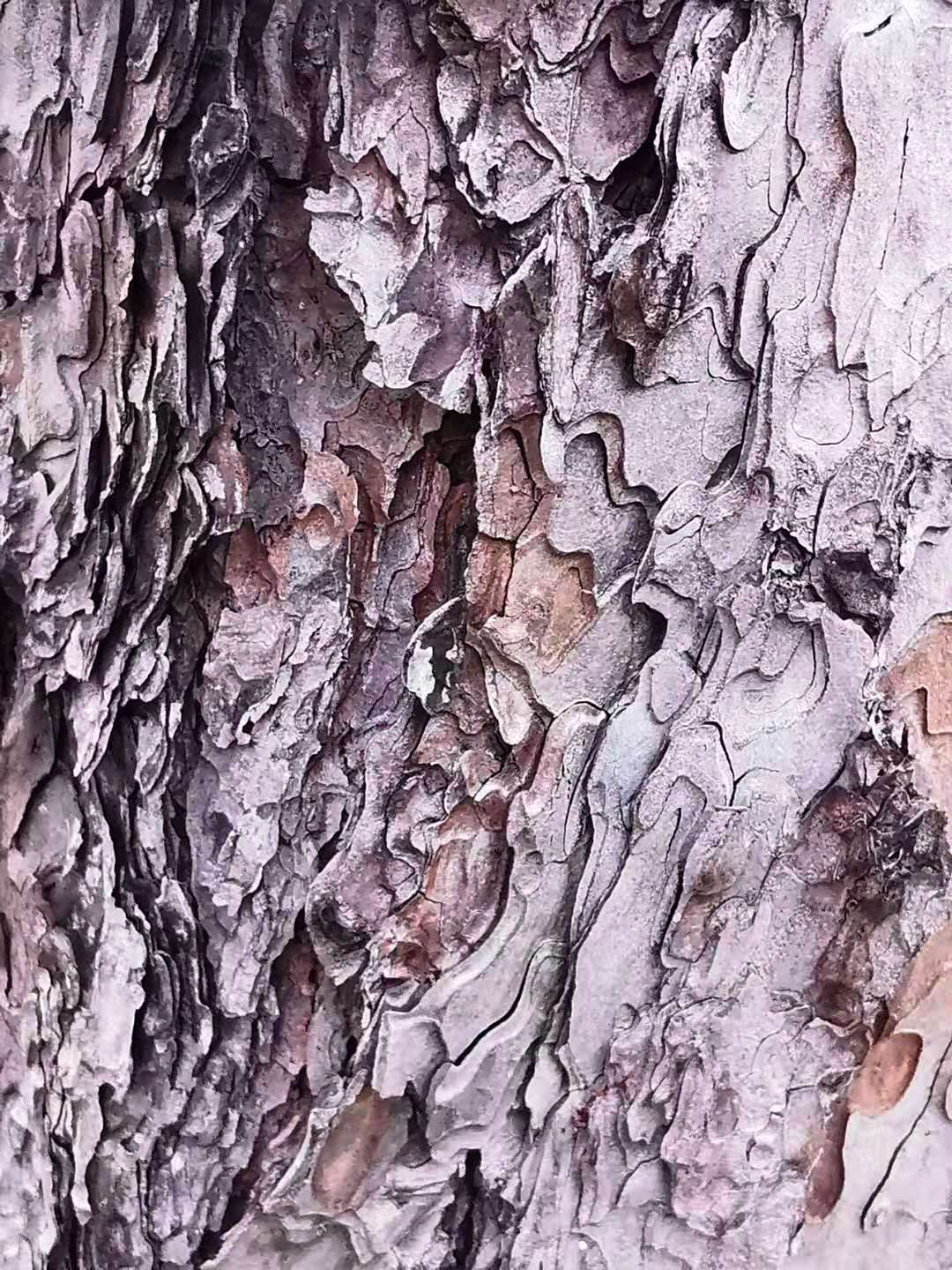
The bark of Pinus thunbergii is made up of multiple shiny layers.

Bark is the outermost layer of stems and roots of woody plants. Plants with bark include trees, woody vines, and shrubs. Bark refers to all the tissues outside the vascular cambium and is a nontechnical term. It overlays the wood and consists of the inner bark and the outer bark. The inner bark, which in older stems is living tissue, includes the innermost layer of the periderm. The outer bark on older stems includes the dead tissue on the surface of the stems, along with parts of the outermost periderm and all the tissues on the outer side of the periderm. The outer bark on trees which lies external to the living periderm is also called the rhytidome.

Products derived from bark include bark shingle siding and wall coverings, spices, and other flavorings, tanbark for tannin, resin, latex, medicines, poisons, various hallucinogenic chemicals, and cork. Bark has been used to make cloth, canoes, and ropes and used as a surface for paintings and map making. A number of plants are also grown for their attractive or interesting bark colorations and surface textures or their bark is used as landscape mulch.

The process of removing bark is decortication and a log or trunk from which bark has been removed is said to be decorticated.

== Botanical description ==
Bark is present only on woody plants - herbaceous plants and stems of young plants lack bark.

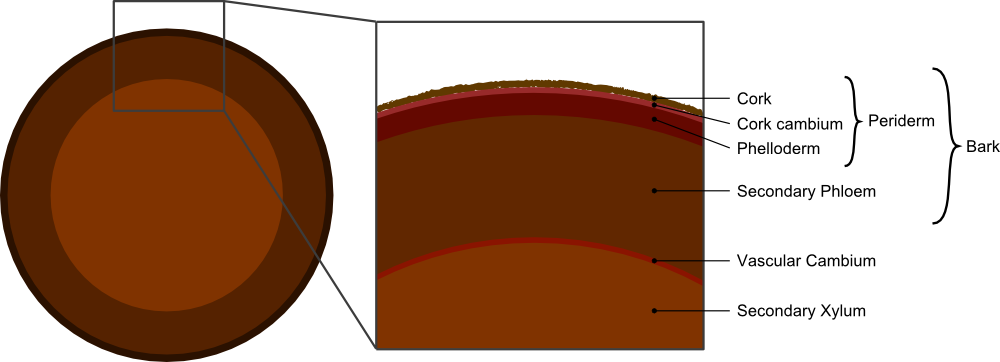
Tree cross section diagram

From the outside to the inside of a mature woody stem, the layers include the following:

1. Bark
  1. Periderm
    1. Cork (phellem or suber), includes the rhytidome
    2. Cork cambium (phellogen)
    3. Phelloderm
  2. Cortex
  3. Phloem
2. Vascular cambium
3. Wood (xylem)
  1. Sapwood (alburnum)
  2. Heartwood (duramen)
4. Pith (medulla)

In young stems, which lack what is commonly called bark, the tissues are, from the outside to the inside:

1. Epidermis, which may be replaced by periderm
2. Cortex
3. Primary and secondary phloem
4. Vascular cambium
5. Secondary and primary xylem.

Cork cell walls contain suberin, a waxy substance which protects the stem against water loss, the invasion of insects into the stem, and prevents infections by bacteria and fungal spores. The cambium tissues, i.e., the cork cambium and the vascular cambium, are the only parts of a woody stem where cell division occurs; undifferentiated cells in the vascular cambium divide rapidly to produce secondary xylem to the inside and secondary phloem to the outside. Phloem is a nutrient-conducting tissue composed of sieve tubes or sieve cells mixed with parenchyma and fibers. The cortex is the primary tissue of stems and roots. In stems the cortex is between the epidermis layer and the phloem, in roots the inner layer is not phloem but the pericycle.

As the stem ages and grows, changes occur that transform the surface of the stem into the bark. The epidermis is a layer of cells that cover the plant body, including the stems, leaves, flowers and fruits, that protects the plant from the outside world. In old stems the epidermal layer, cortex, and primary phloem become separated from the inner tissues by thicker formations of cork. Due to the thickening cork layer these cells die because they do not receive water and nutrients. This dead layer is the rough corky bark that forms around tree trunks and other stems.

Cork, sometimes confused with bark in colloquial speech, is the outermost layer of a woody stem, derived from the cork cambium. It serves as protection against damage from parasites, herbivorous animals and diseases, as well as dehydration and fire.

=== Periderm ===
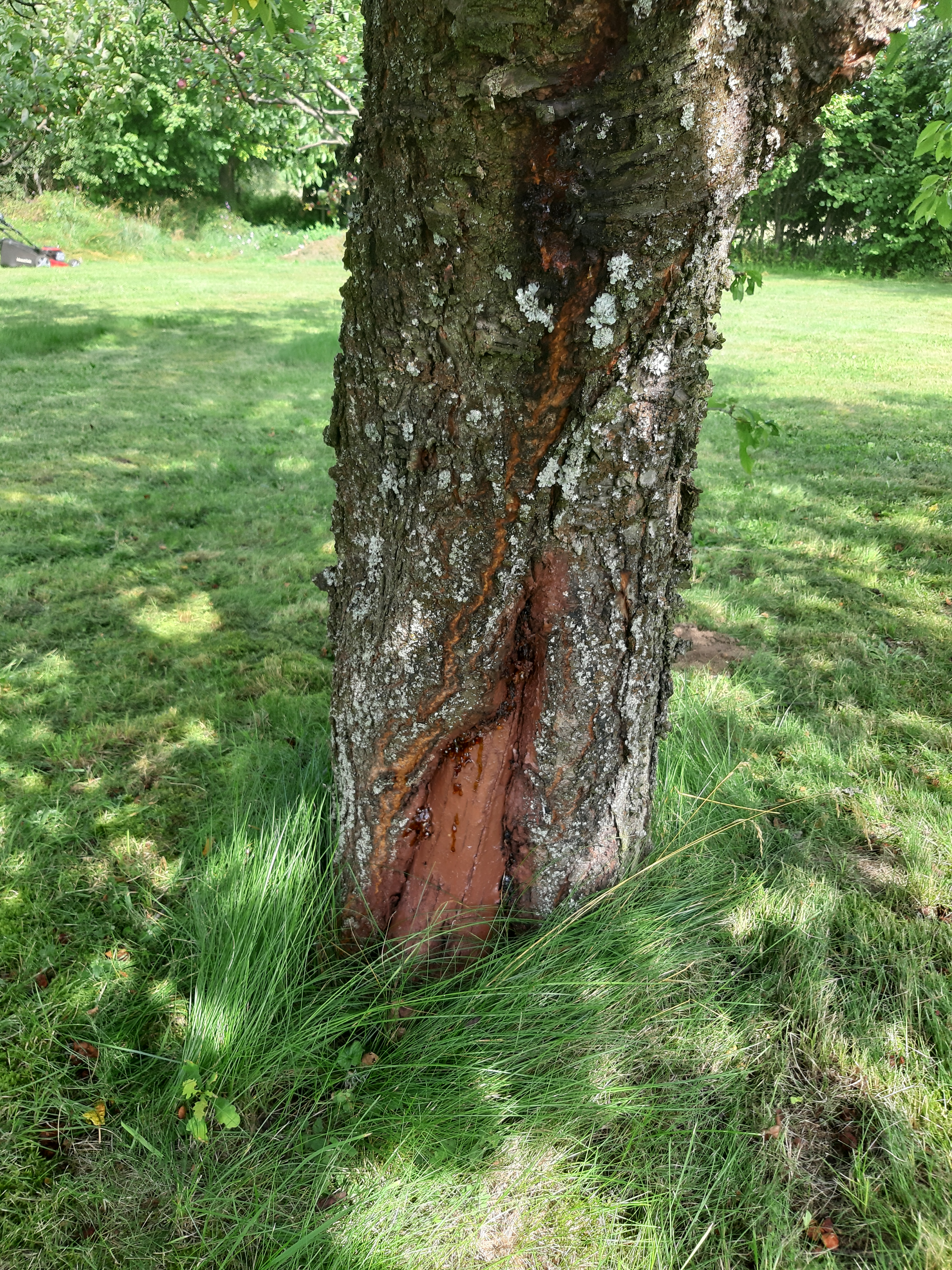
Damaged bark of a cherry tree

Often a secondary covering called the periderm forms on small woody stems and many non-woody plants, which is composed of cork (phellem), the cork cambium (phellogen), and the phelloderm. The periderm forms from the phellogen which serves as a lateral meristem. The periderm replaces the epidermis, and acts as a protective covering like the epidermis. Mature phellem cells have suberin in their walls to protect the stem from desiccation and pathogen attack. Older phellem cells are dead, as is the case with woody stems. The skin on the potato tuber (which is an underground stem) constitutes the cork of the periderm.

In woody plants, the epidermis of newly grown stems is replaced by the periderm later in the year. As the stems grow a layer of cells form under the epidermis, called the cork cambium, these cells produce cork cells that turn into cork. A limited number of cell layers may form interior to the cork cambium, called the phelloderm. As the stem grows, the cork cambium produces new layers of cork which are impermeable to gases and water and the cells outside the periderm, namely the epidermis, cortex and older secondary phloem die.

Within the periderm are lenticels, which form during the production of the first periderm layer. Since there are living cells within the cambium layers that need to exchange gases during metabolism, these lenticels, because they have numerous intercellular spaces, allow gaseous exchange with the outside atmosphere. As the bark develops, new lenticels are formed within the cracks of the cork layers.

=== Rhytidome ===
The rhytidome is the most familiar part of bark, being the outer layer that covers the trunks of trees. It is composed mostly of dead cells and is produced by the formation of multiple layers of suberized periderm, cortical and phloem tissue. The rhytidome is especially well developed in older stems and roots of trees. In shrubs, older bark is quickly exfoliated and thick rhytidome accumulates. It is generally thickest and most distinctive at the trunk or bole (the area from the ground to where the main branching starts) of the tree.

== Chemical composition ==
Bark tissues make up by weight between 10 and 20% of woody vascular plants and consists of various biopolymers, tannins, lignin, suberin and polysaccharides. Up to 40% of the bark tissue is made of lignin, which forms an important part of a plant, providing structural support by crosslinking between different polysaccharides, such as cellulose.

Condensed tannin, which is in fairly high concentration in bark tissue, is thought to inhibit decomposition. It could be due to this factor that the degradation of lignin is far less pronounced in bark tissue than it is in wood. It has been proposed that, in the cork layer (the phellogen), suberin acts as a barrier to microbial degradation and so protects the internal structure of the plant. Norway spruce (Picea abies) bark also contains extractable stilbenoid glucosides and pectic polysaccharides.

Analysis of the lignin in the bark wall during decay by the white-rot fungi Lentinula edodes (Shiitake mushroom) using ^{13}C NMR revealed that the lignin polymers contained more Guaiacyl lignin units than Syringyl units compared to the interior of the plant. Guaiacyl units are less susceptible to degradation as, compared to syringyl, they contain fewer aryl-aryl bonds, can form a condensed lignin structure, and have a lower redox potential. This could mean that the concentration and type of lignin units could provide additional resistance to fungal decay for plants protected by bark.

== Damage and repair ==
Bark can sustain damage from environmental factors, such as frost crack and sun scald, as well as biological factors, such as woodpecker and boring beetle attacks. Male deer and other male members of the Cervidae (deer family) can cause extensive bark damage during the rutting season by rubbing their antlers against a tree to remove their velvet.

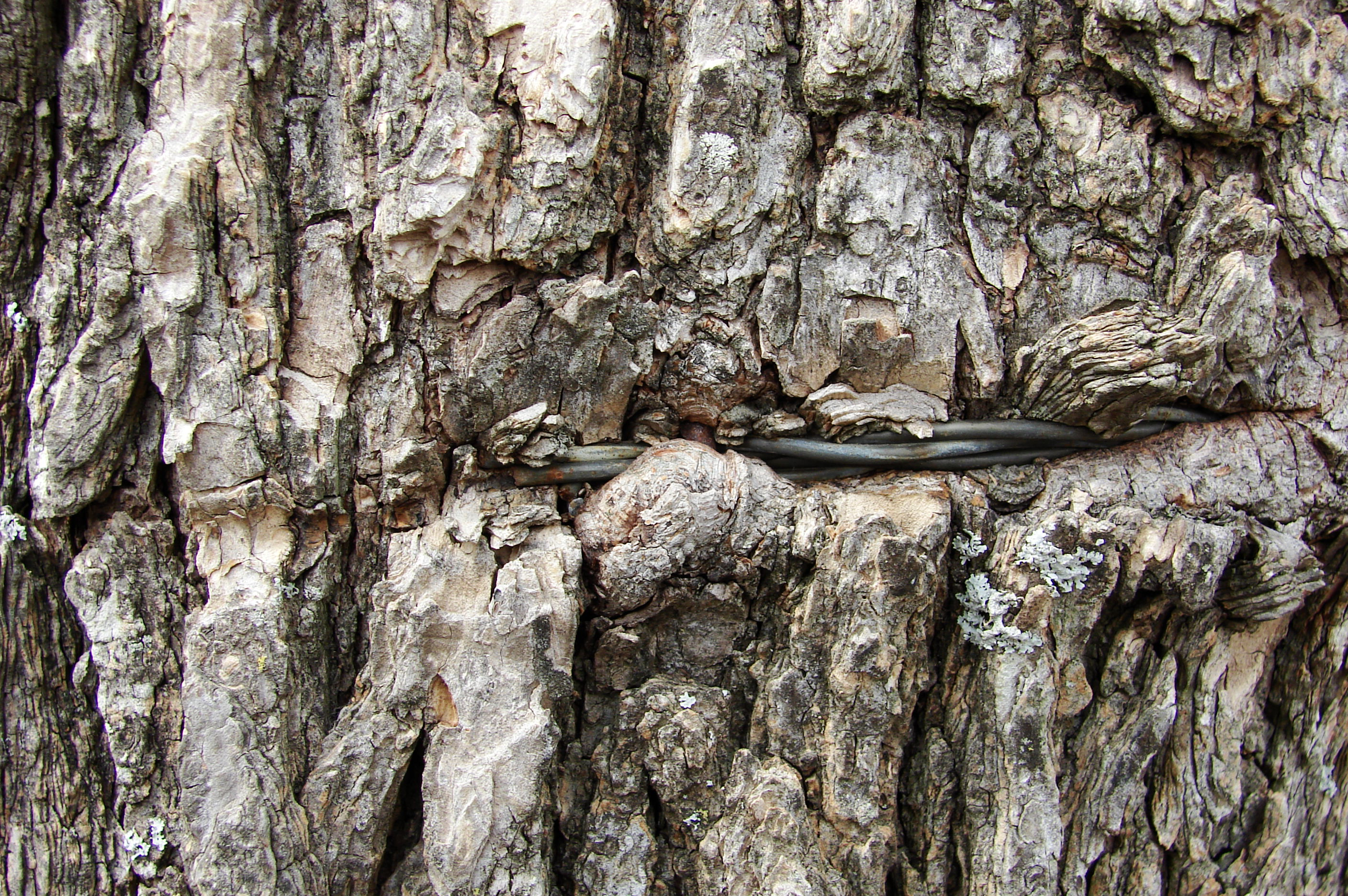
Living tree bark enveloping barbed wire

The bark is often damaged by being bound to stakes or wrapped with wires. In the past, this damage was called bark-galling and was treated by applying clay laid on the galled place and binding it up with hay. In modern usage, "galling" most typically refers to a type of abnormal growth on a plant caused by insects or pathogens.

Bark damage can have several detrimental effects on the plant. Bark serves as a physical barrier to disease pressure, especially from fungi, so its removal makes the plant more susceptible to disease. Damage or destruction of the phloem impedes the transport of photosynthetic products throughout the plant; in extreme cases, when a band of phloem all the way around the stem is removed, the plant will usually quickly die. This method of killing a woody plant is called girdling, and can be used by humans as a forestry or horticultural technique, though it often results in unwanted aesthetic damage.

The degree to which woody plants are able to repair gross physical damage to their bark is quite variable across species and type of damage. Some are able to produce a callus growth which heals over the wound rapidly, but leaves a clear scar, whilst others such as oaks do not produce an extensive callus repair. Sap is sometimes produced to seal the damaged area against disease and insect intrusion.

A number of living organisms live in or on bark, including insects, fungi and other plants like mosses, algae and other vascular plants. Many of these organisms are pathogens or parasites but some also have symbiotic relationships.

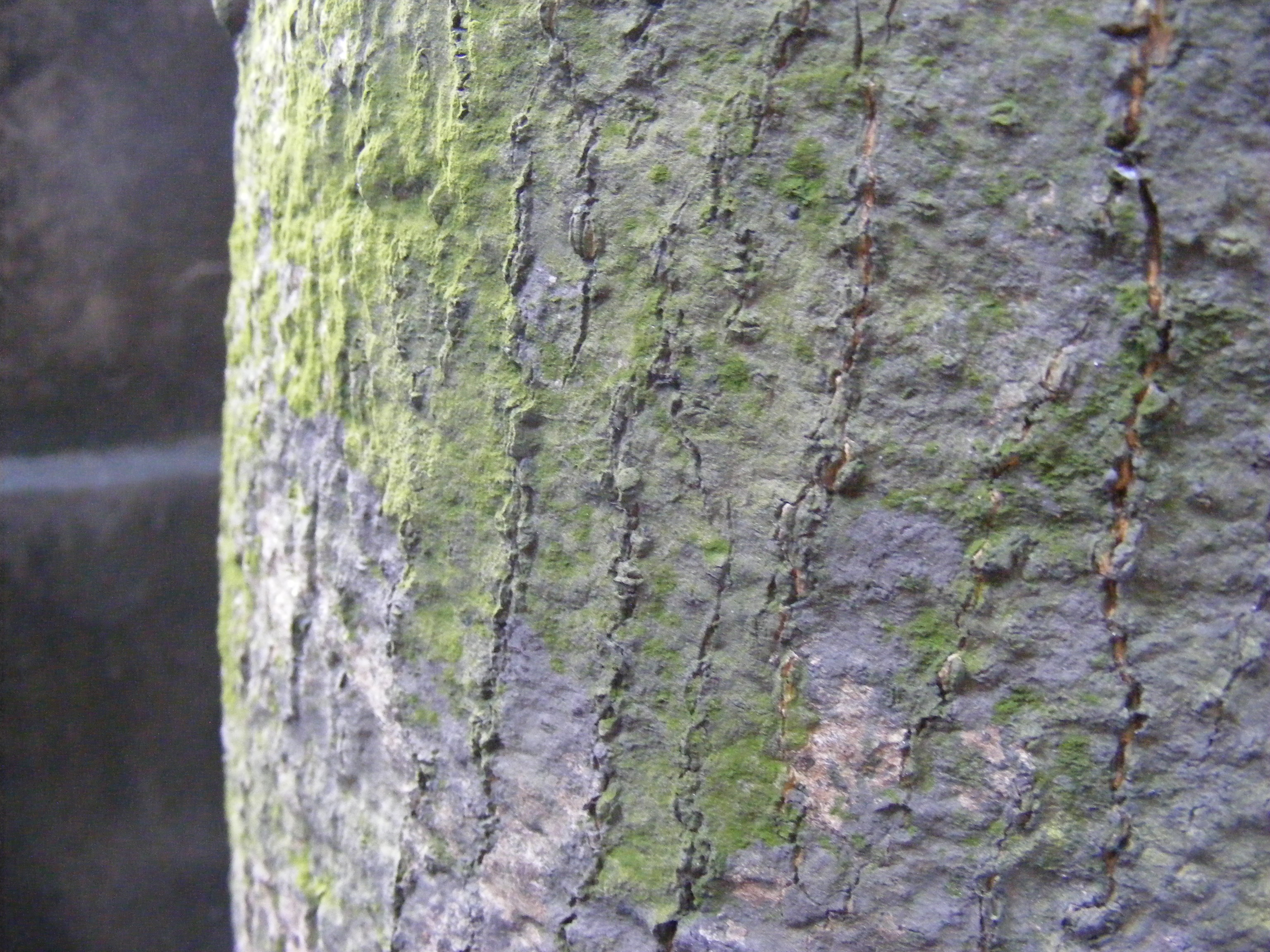
Bark of mature mango (Mangifera indica) showing lichen growth

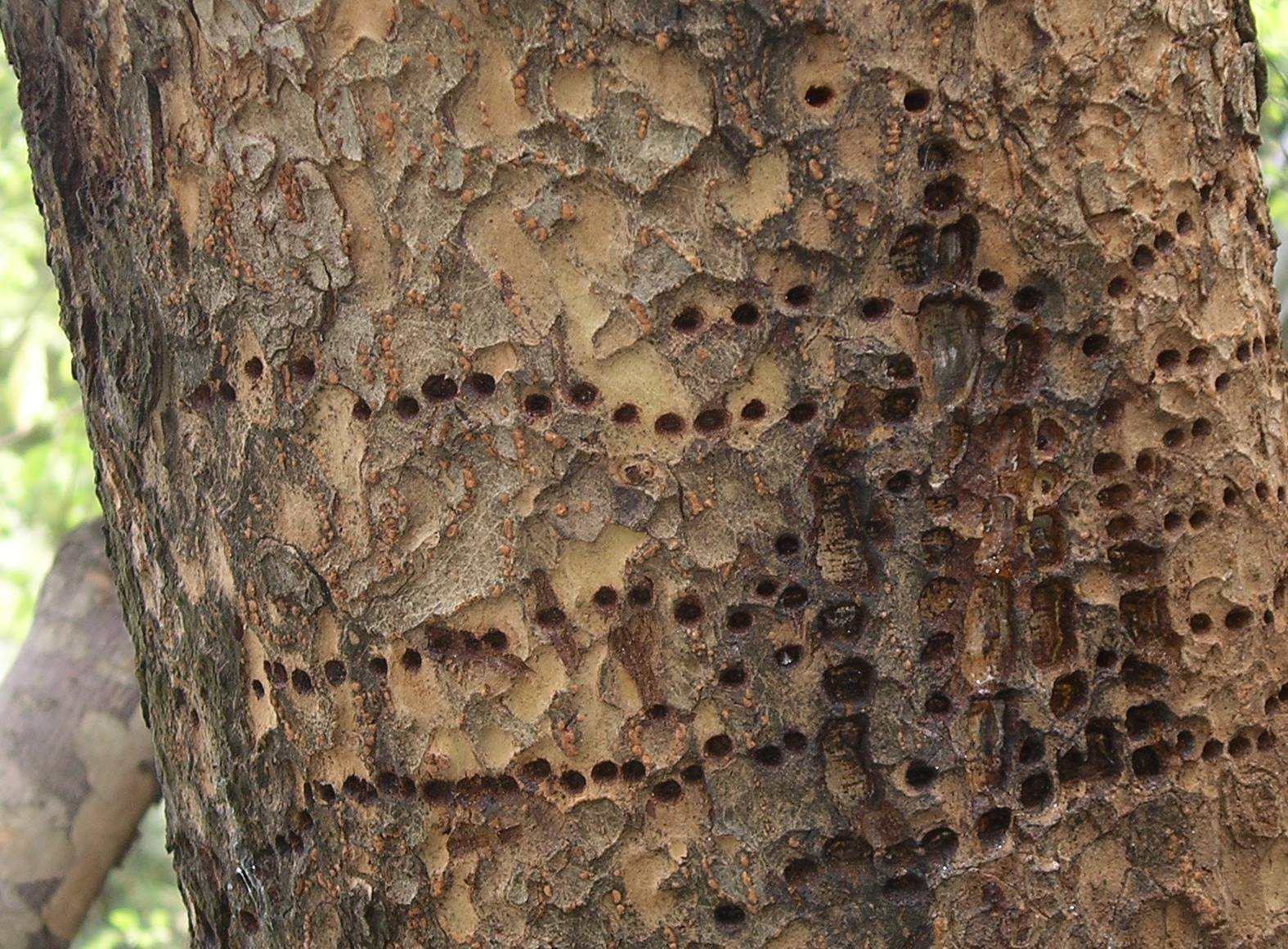
The patterns left in the bark of a Chinese evergreen elm after repeated visits by a yellow-bellied sapsucker (woodpecker) in early 2012.

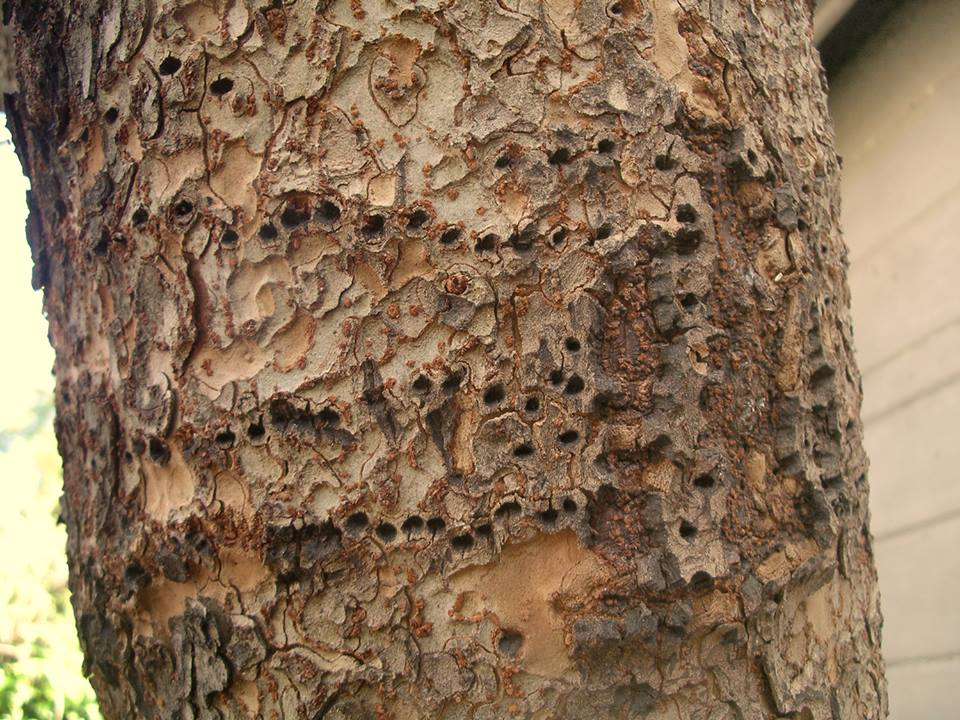
The self-repair of the Chinese evergreen elm showing new bark growth, lenticels, and other self-repair of the holes made by a yellow-bellied sapsucker (woodpecker) about two years earlier.

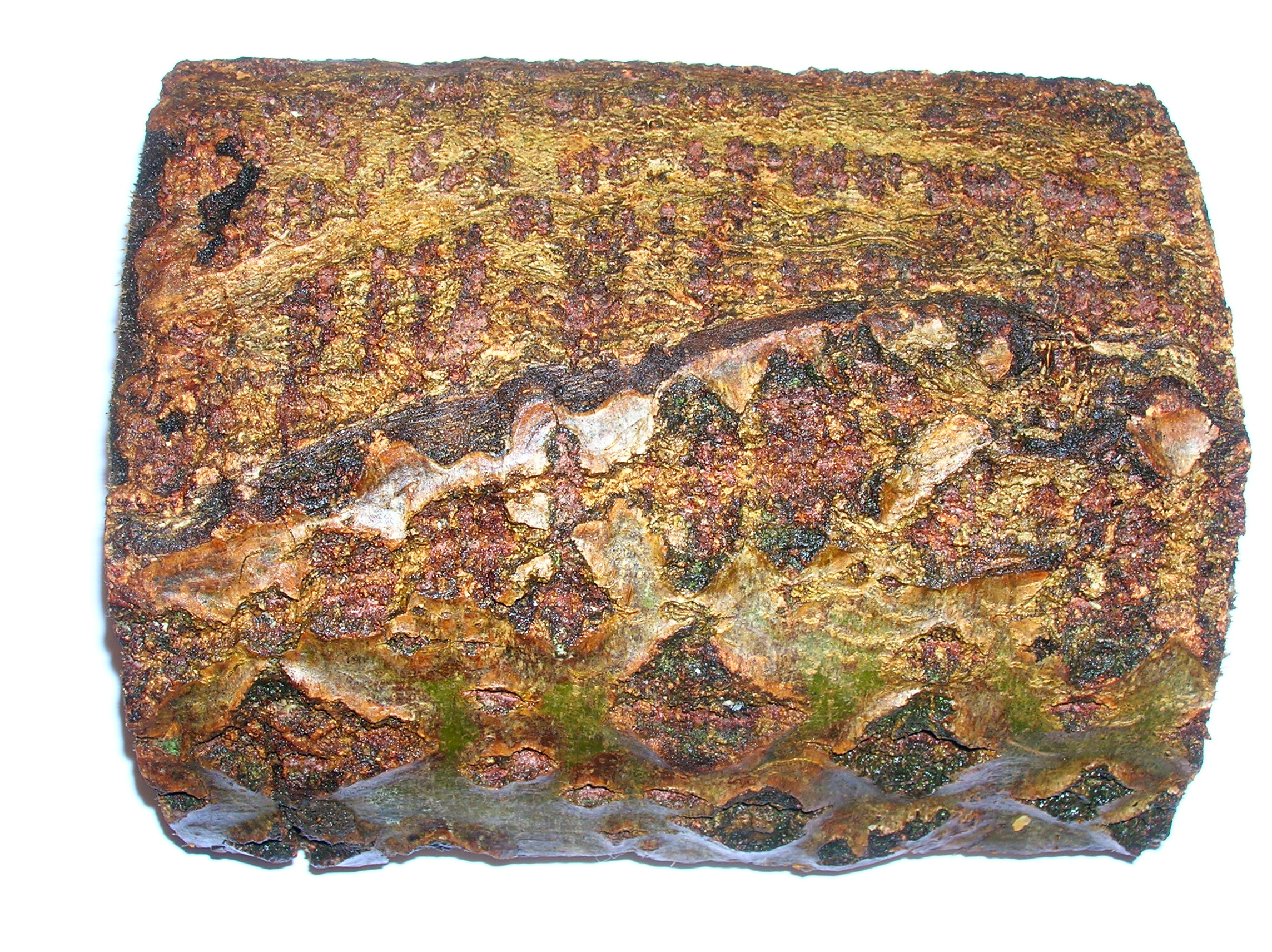
Alder bark (Alnus glutinosa) with characteristic lenticels and abnormal lenticels on callused areas.

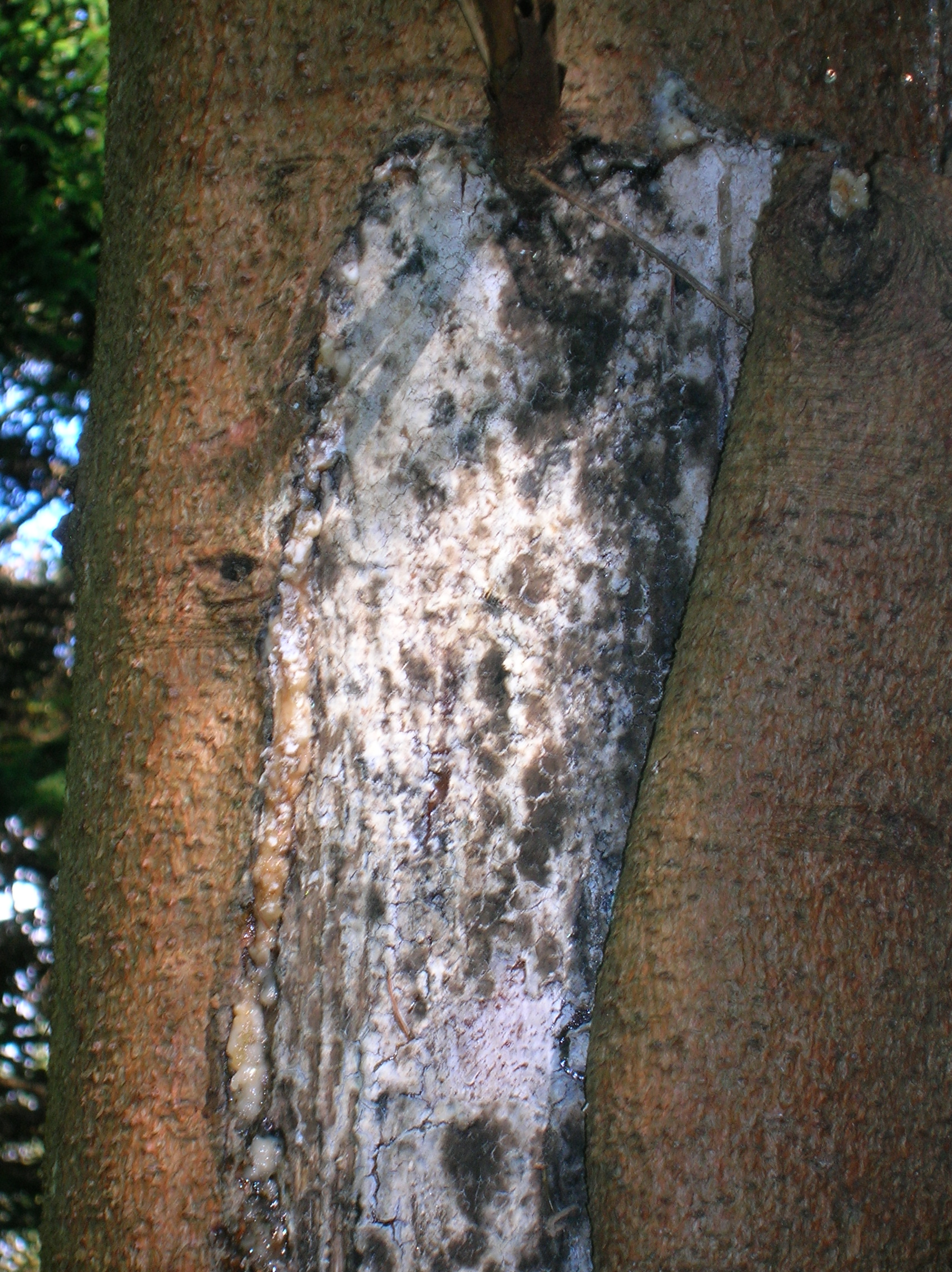
Sun scald damage on Sitka spruce

== Uses ==
The inner bark (phloem) of some trees is edible. In hunter-gatherer societies and in times of famine, it is harvested and used as a food source. In Scandinavia, bark bread is made from rye to which the toasted and ground innermost layer of bark of scots pine or birch is added. The Sami people of far northern Europe use large sheets of Pinus sylvestris bark that are removed in the spring, prepared and stored for use as a staple food resource. The inner bark is eaten fresh, dried or roasted.

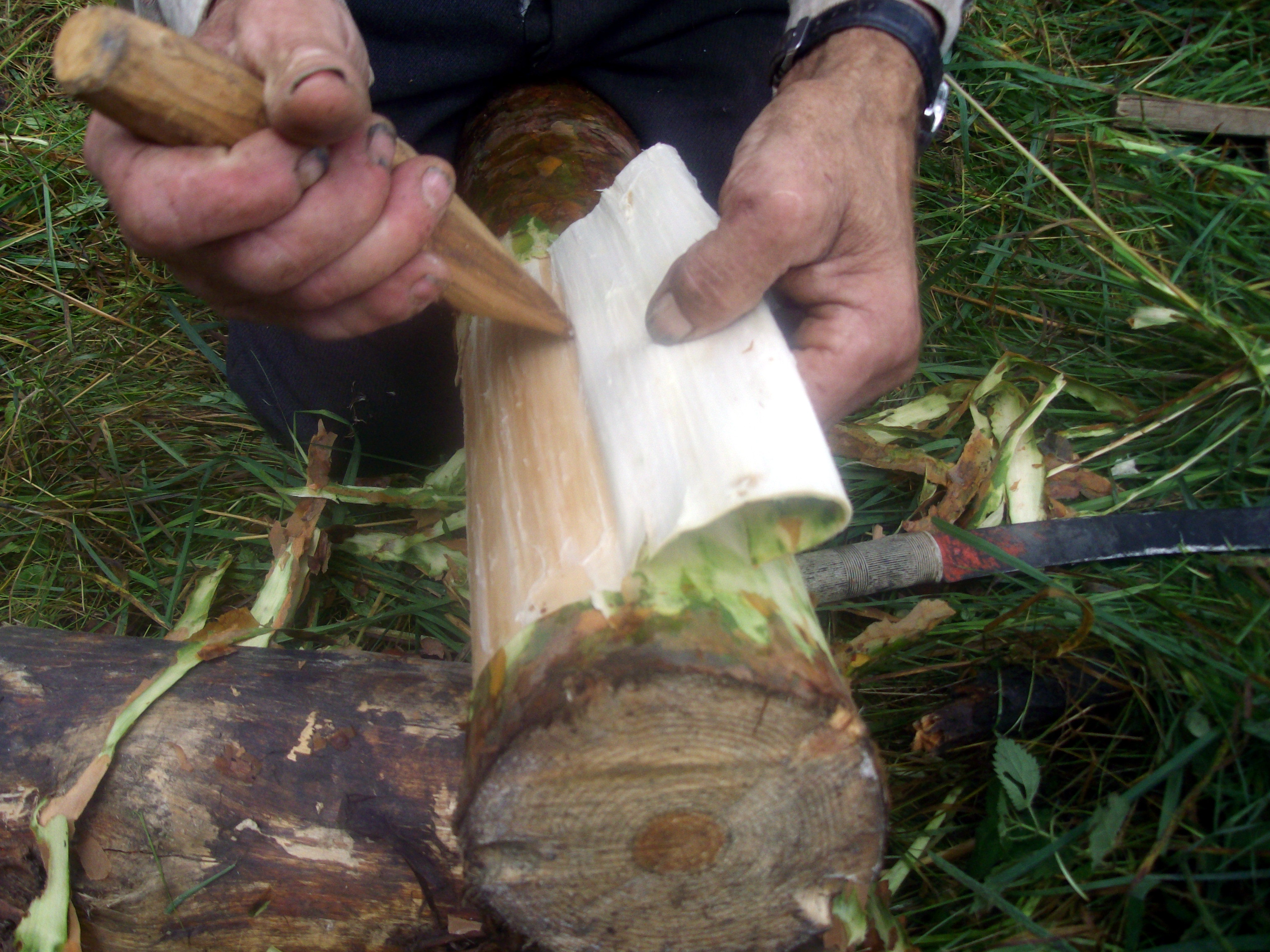
Pine bark was used as emergency food in Finland during famine, as recently as the 1918 civil war.

Bark can be used as a construction material, and was used widely in pre-industrial societies. Some barks, particularly birch bark, can be removed in long sheets and other mechanically cohesive structures, allowing the bark to be used in the construction of canoes, as the drainage layer in roofs, for shoes, backpacks, and other useful items. Bark was also used as a construction material in settler colonial societies, particularly Australia, both as exterior wall cladding and as a roofing material.

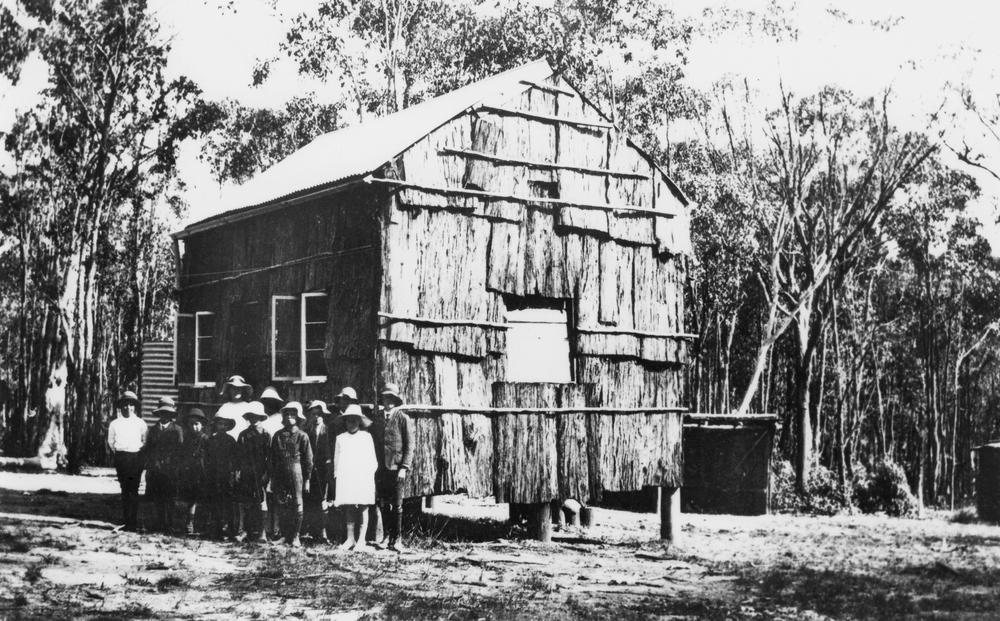
A 1922 bark-clad schoolhouse in Queensland, Australia

Eucalypt bark from across Australia has been used for a variety of purposes for thousands of years, including the Yirrkala bark petitions, which were made from a stringybark used for painting. Scarred trees are significant for Australian Aboriginal culture, being used for canoes, shields and coolamons.

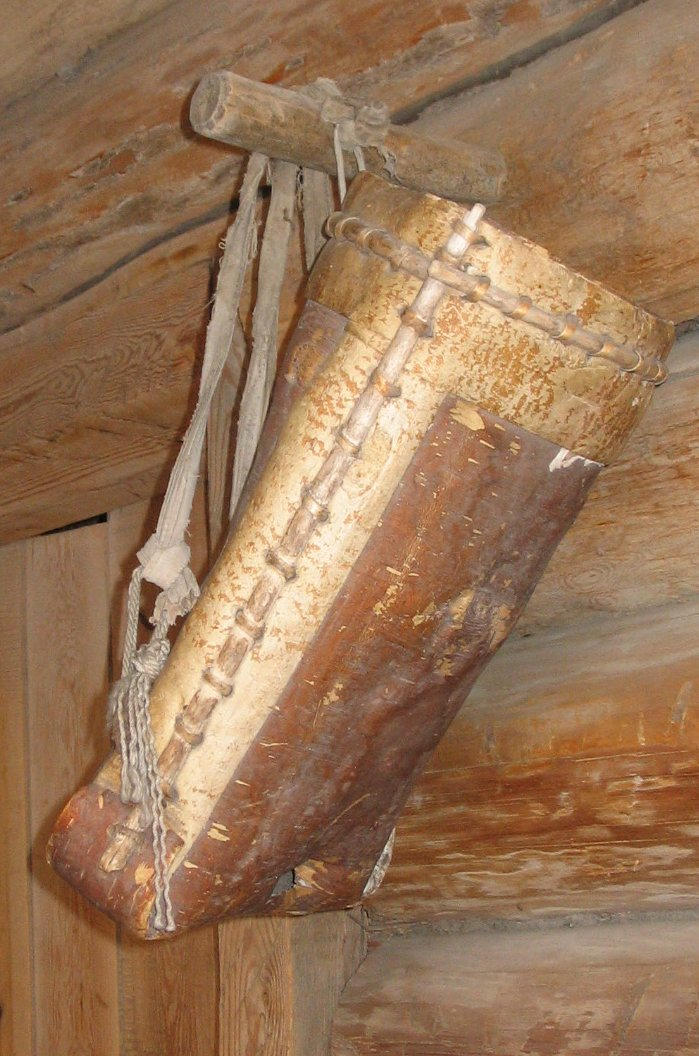
Backpack made of birch bark. Museum by Lake Baikal, Russia

In the cork oak (Quercus suber) the bark is thick enough to be harvested as a cork product without killing the tree; in this species the bark may get very thick (e.g. more than 20 cm has been reported). This may have been an adaption to help the tree survive wildfires.

Some stem barks have significantly different phytochemical content from other parts. Some of these phytochemicals have pesticidal, culinary, or medicinally and culturally important ethnopharmacological properties.

Bark contains strong fibres known as bast, and there is a long tradition in northern Europe of using bark from coppiced young branches of the small-leaved lime (Tilia cordata) to produce cordage and rope, used for example in the rigging of Viking Age longships.

Among the commercial products made from bark are cork, cinnamon, quinine (from the bark of Cinchona) and aspirin (from the bark of willow trees). The bark of some trees, notably oak (Quercus robur) is a source of tannic acid, which is used in tanning. Bark chips generated as a by-product of lumber production are often used in bark mulch. Bark is important to the horticultural industry since in shredded form it is used for plants that do not thrive in ordinary soil, such as epiphytes.

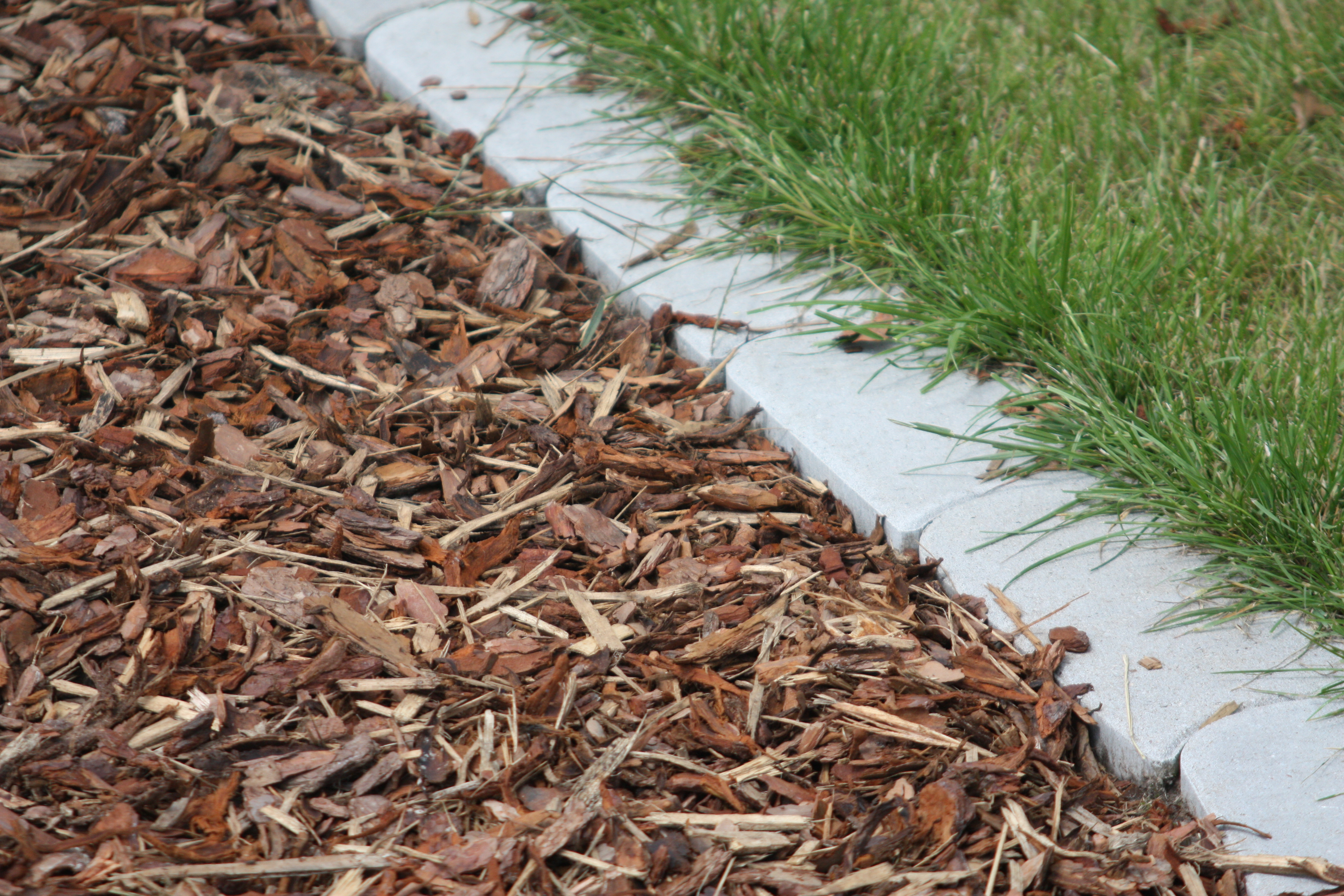
Bark chips

Wood bark contains lignin which when pyrolyzed yields a liquid bio-oil product rich in natural phenol derivatives. These are used as a replacement for fossil-based phenols in phenol-formaldehyde (PF) resins used in oriented strand board (OSB) and plywood.

== Gallery ==
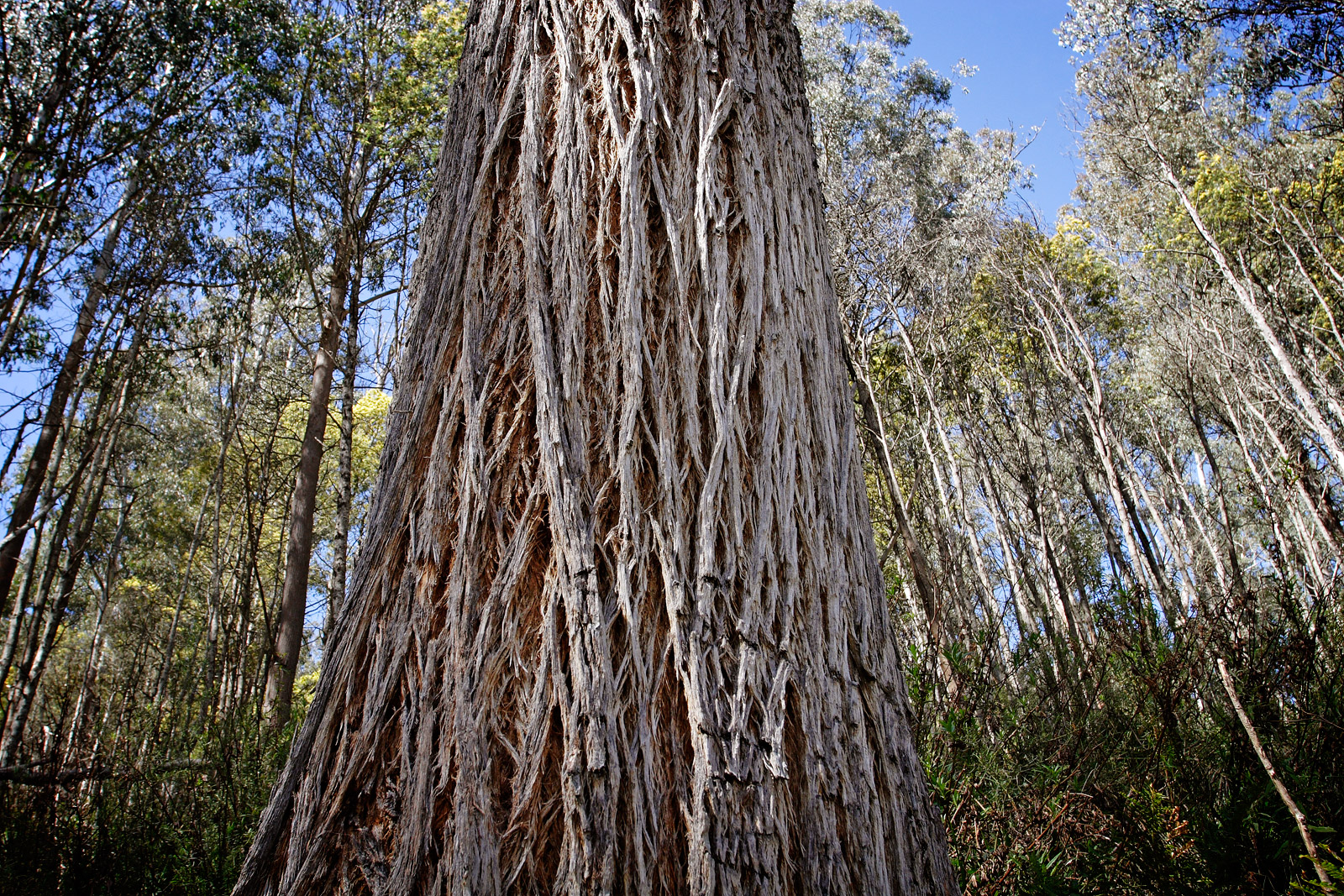
Eucalypt bark

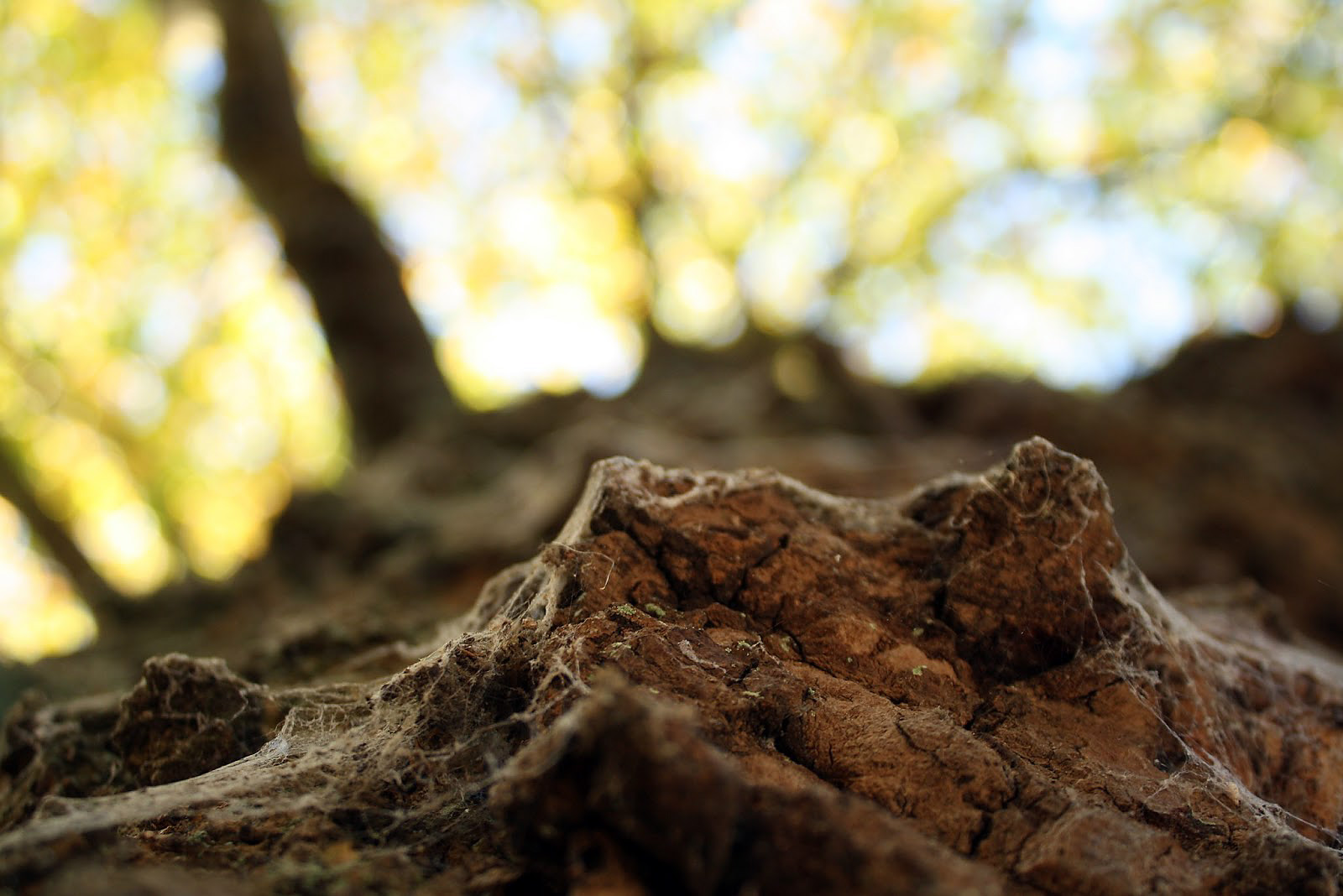
Close-up of living bark on a tree in England

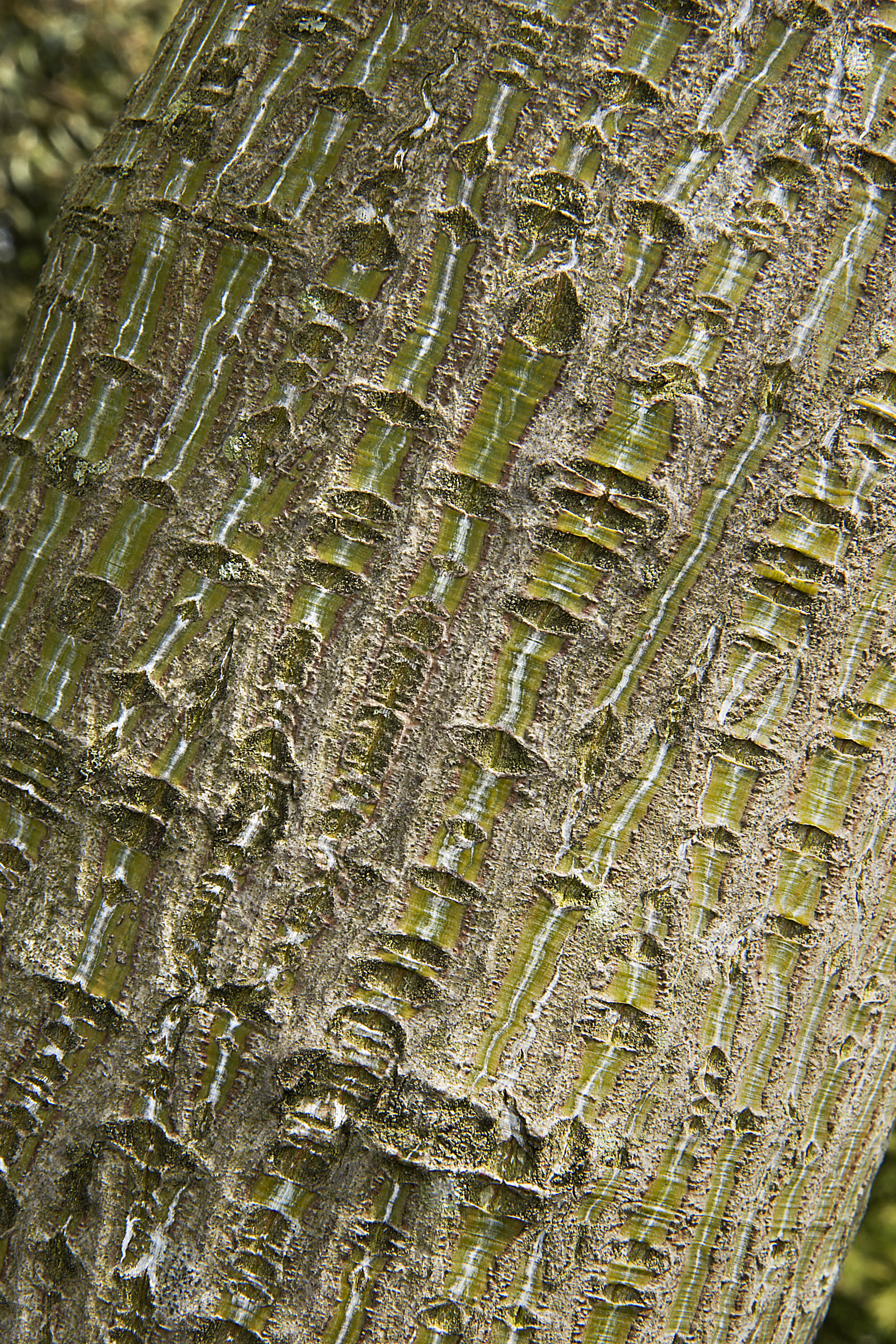
Acer capillipes (red snakebark maple)

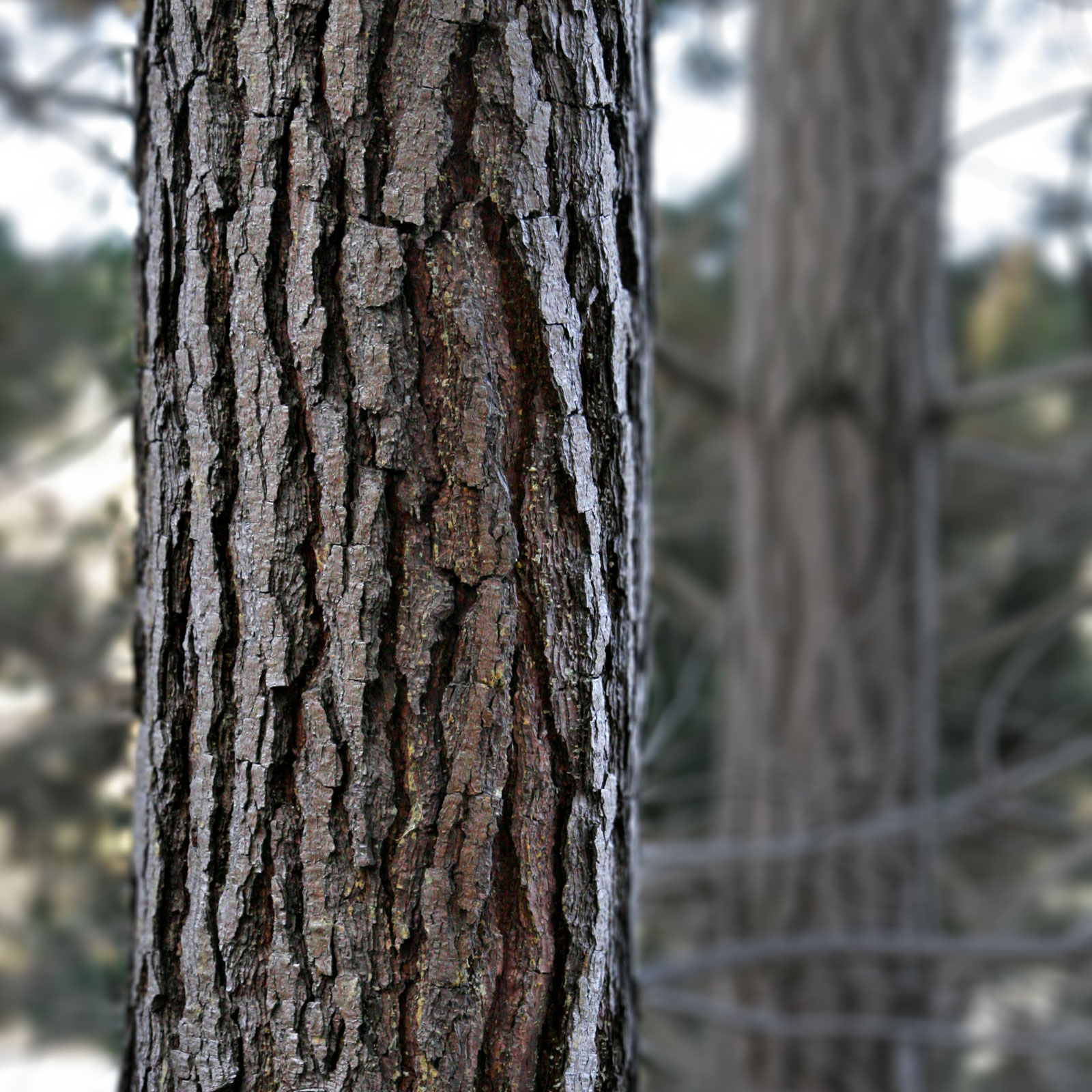
Monterey pine bark

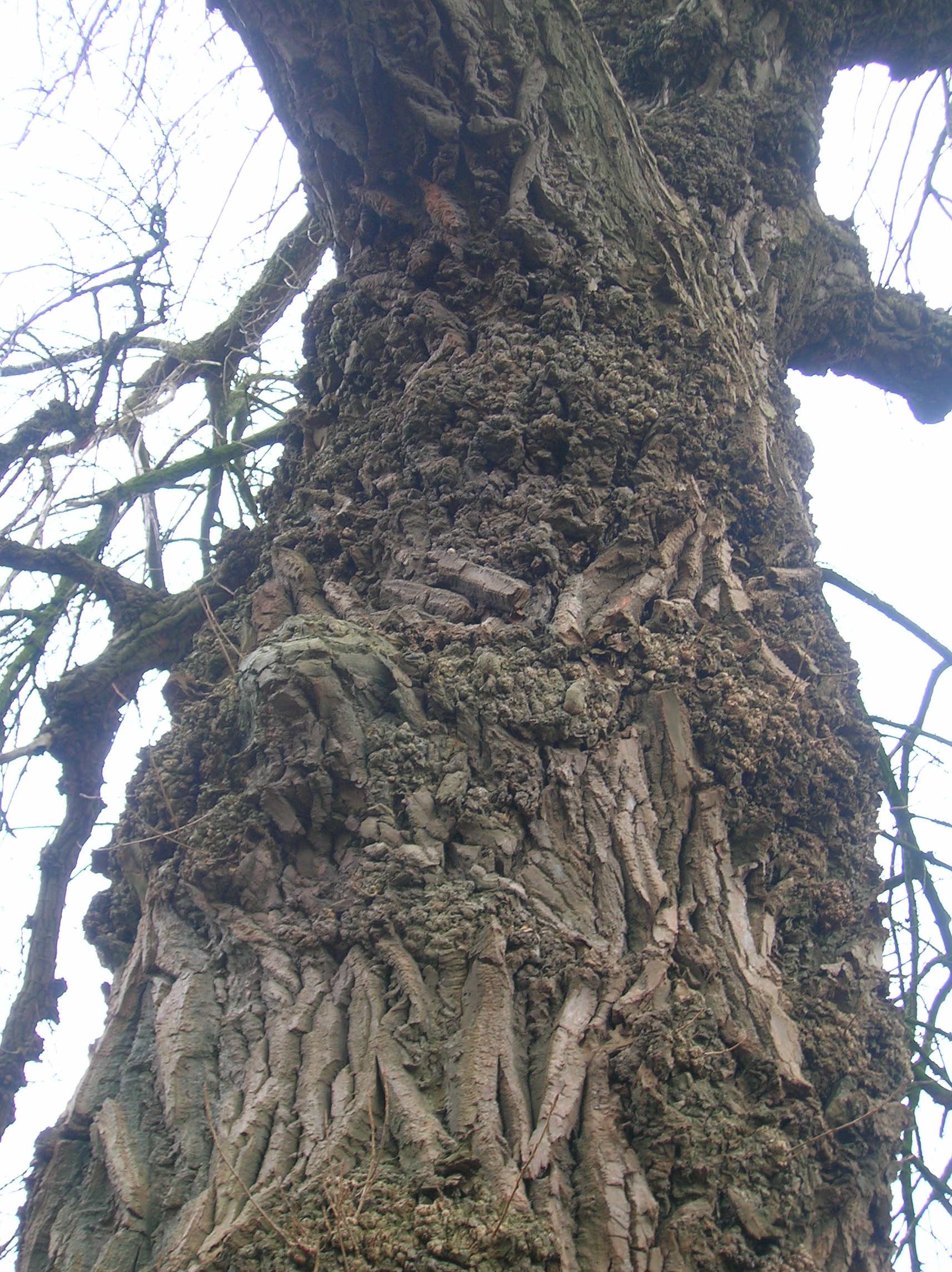
A rare black poplar tree, showing the bark and burls.

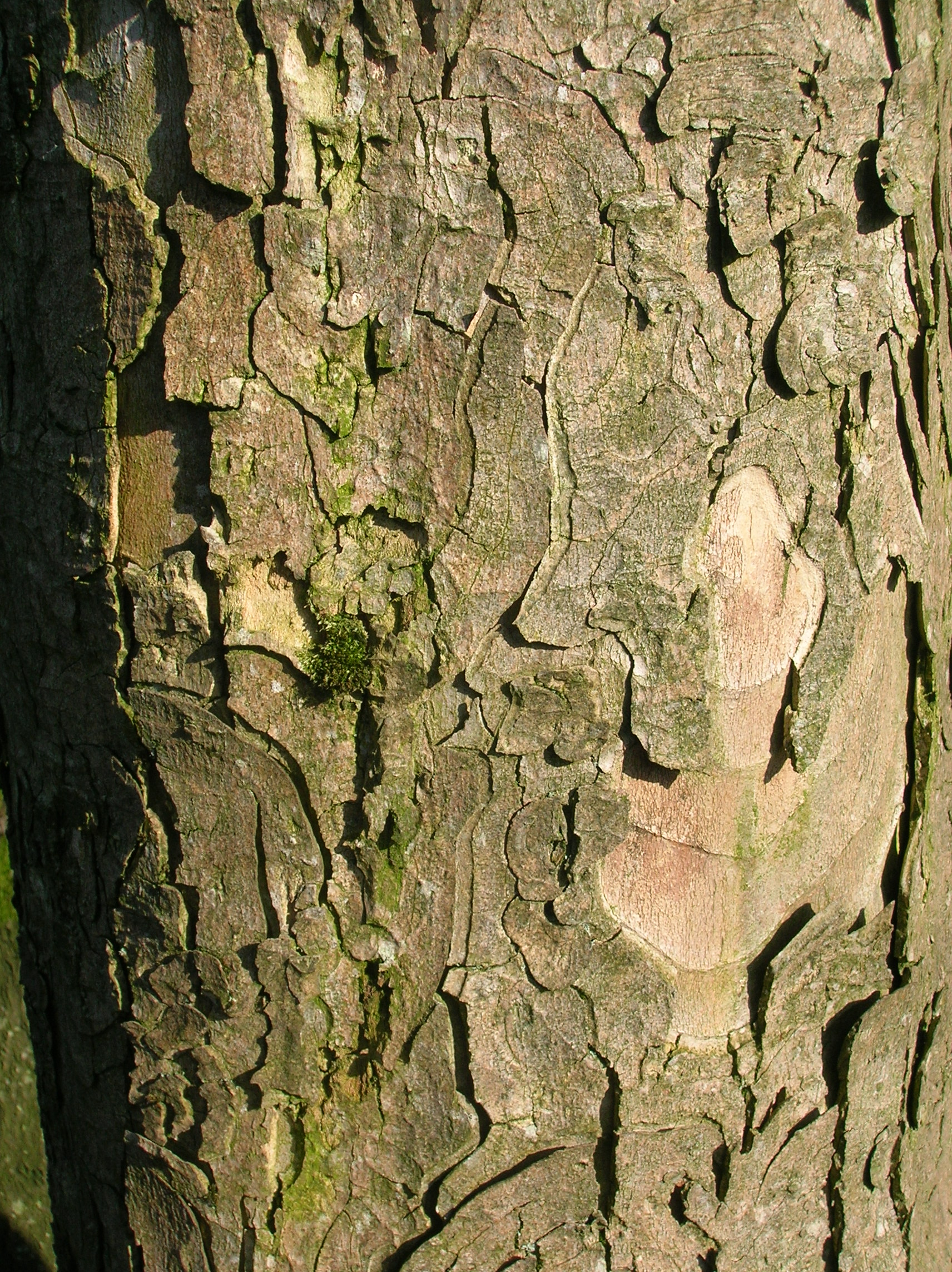
The typical appearance of sycamore bark from an old tree.

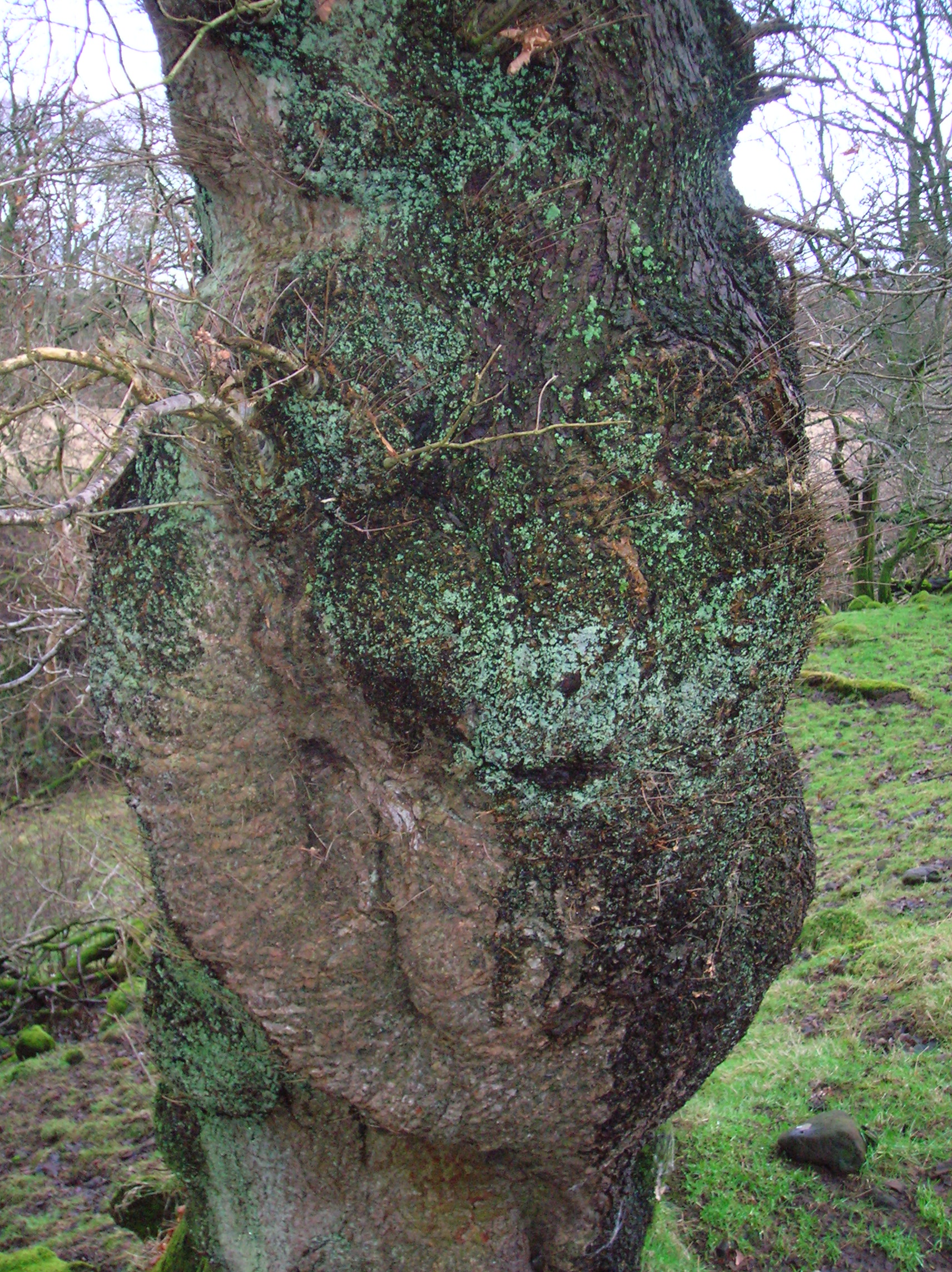
Quercus robur bark with a large burl and lichen.

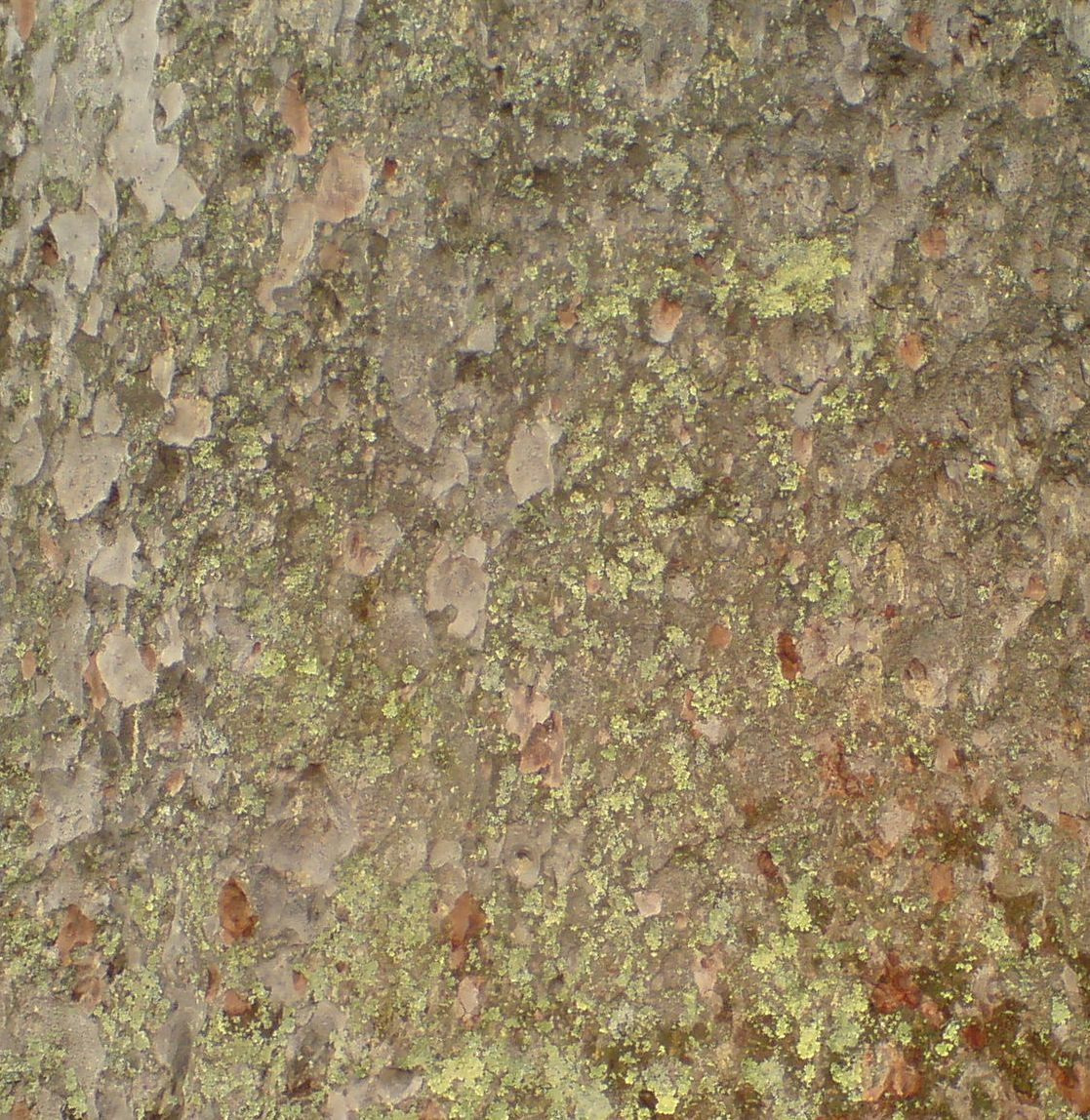
Kauri bark

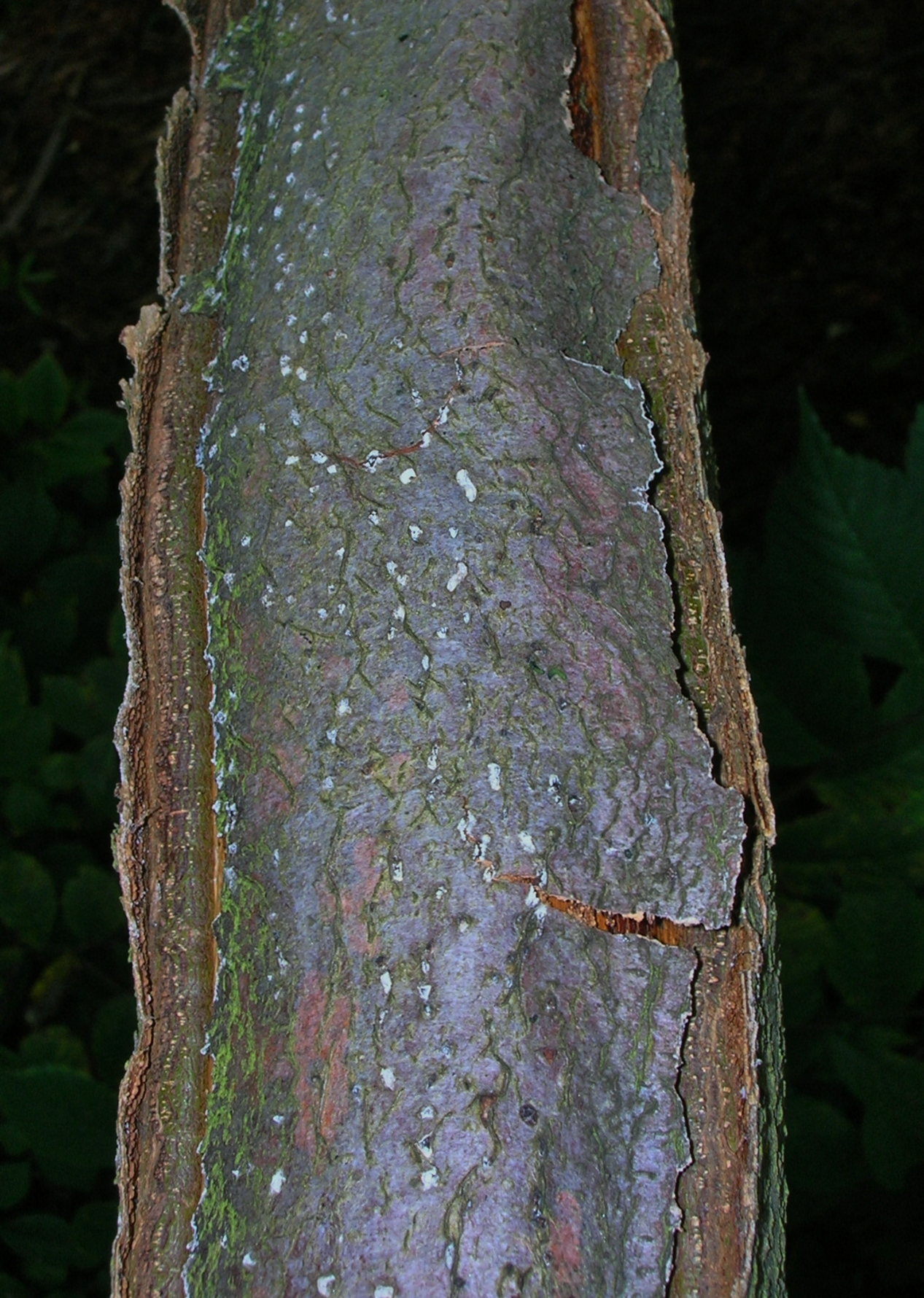
Beech bark with callus growth following fire (heat) damage

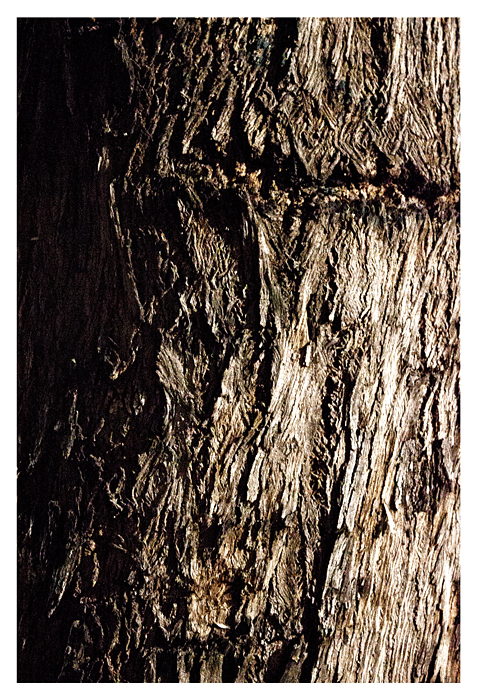
Damaged bark

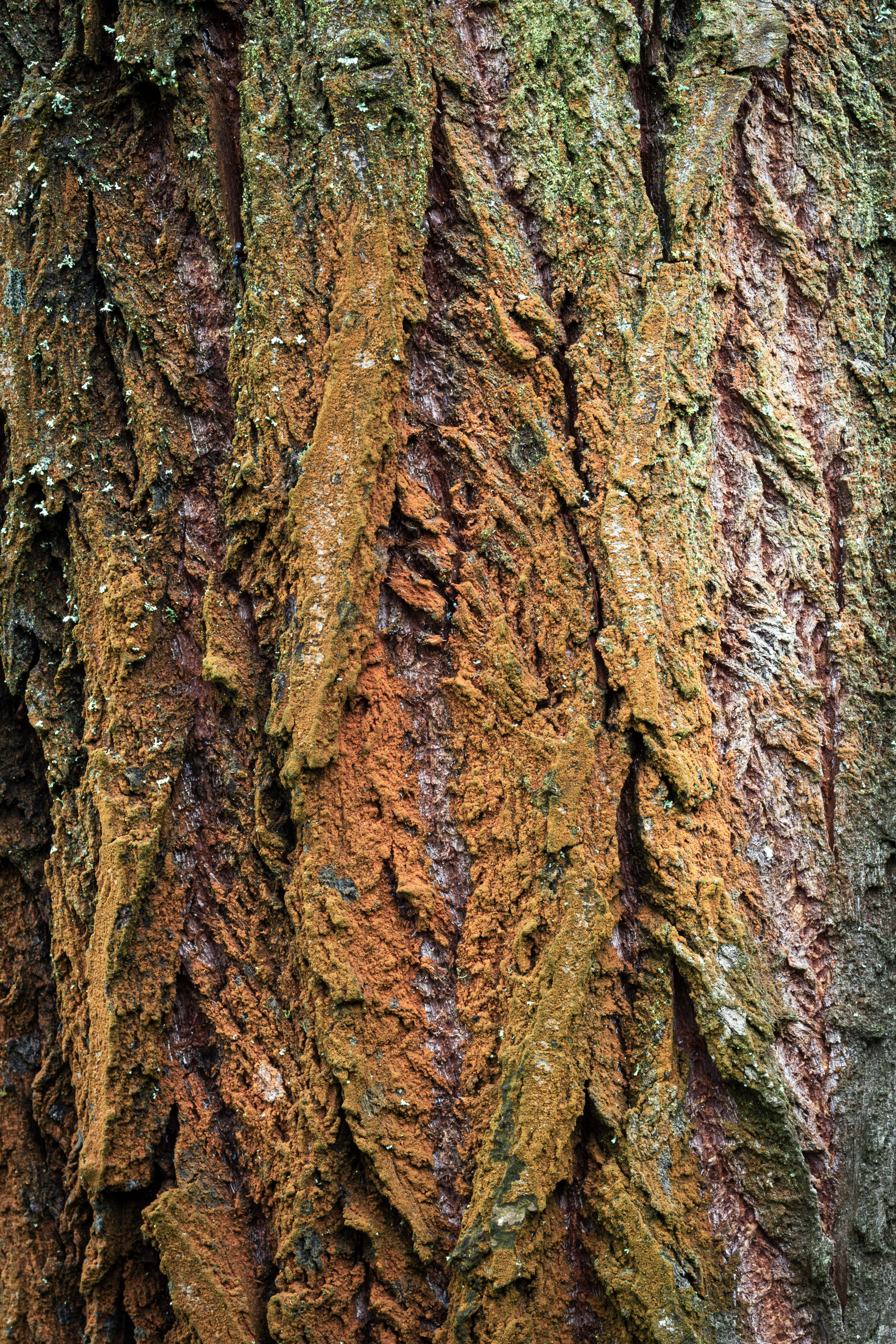
Common oak bark

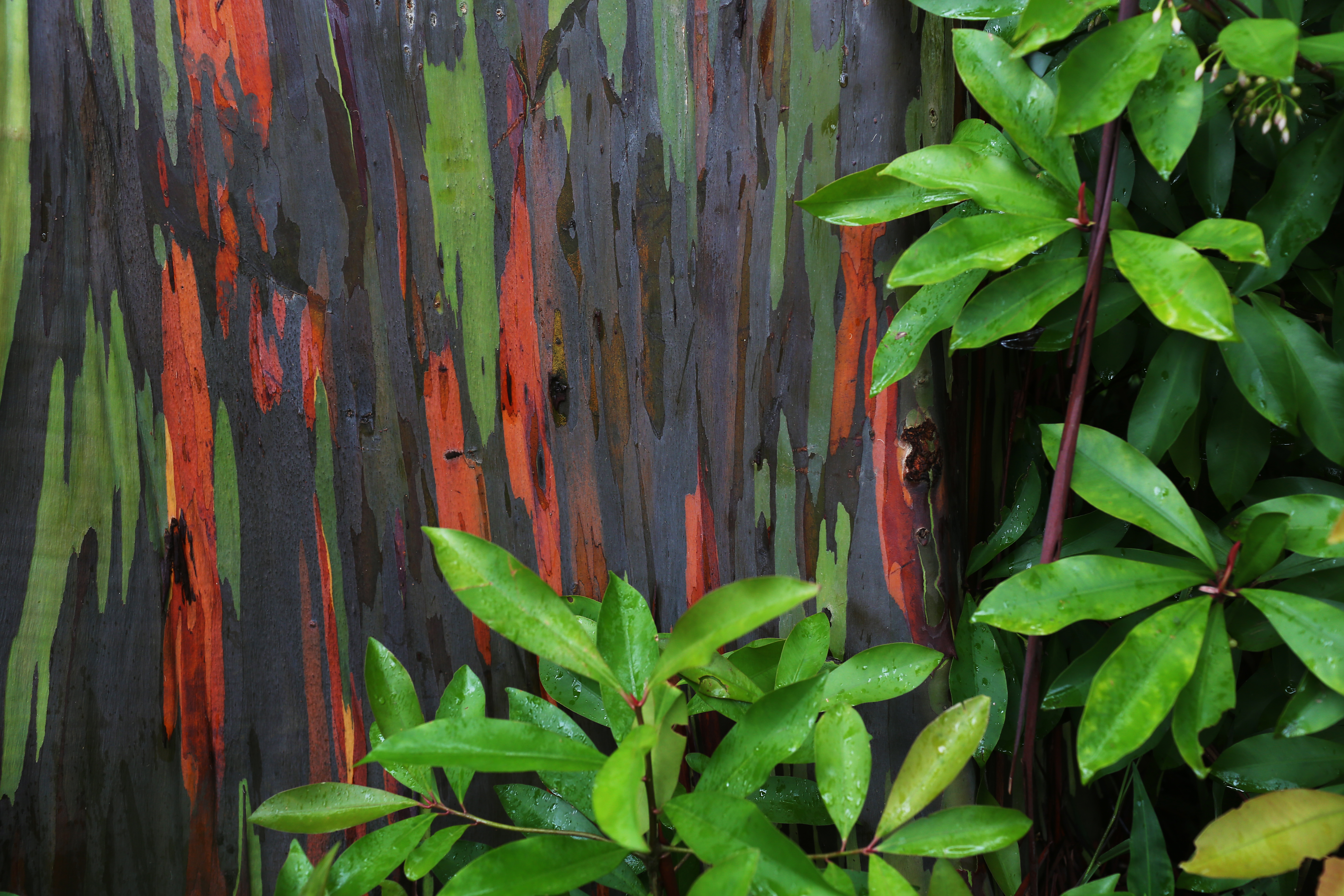
"Rainbow" Eucalyptus bark on the Hawaiian island of Maui

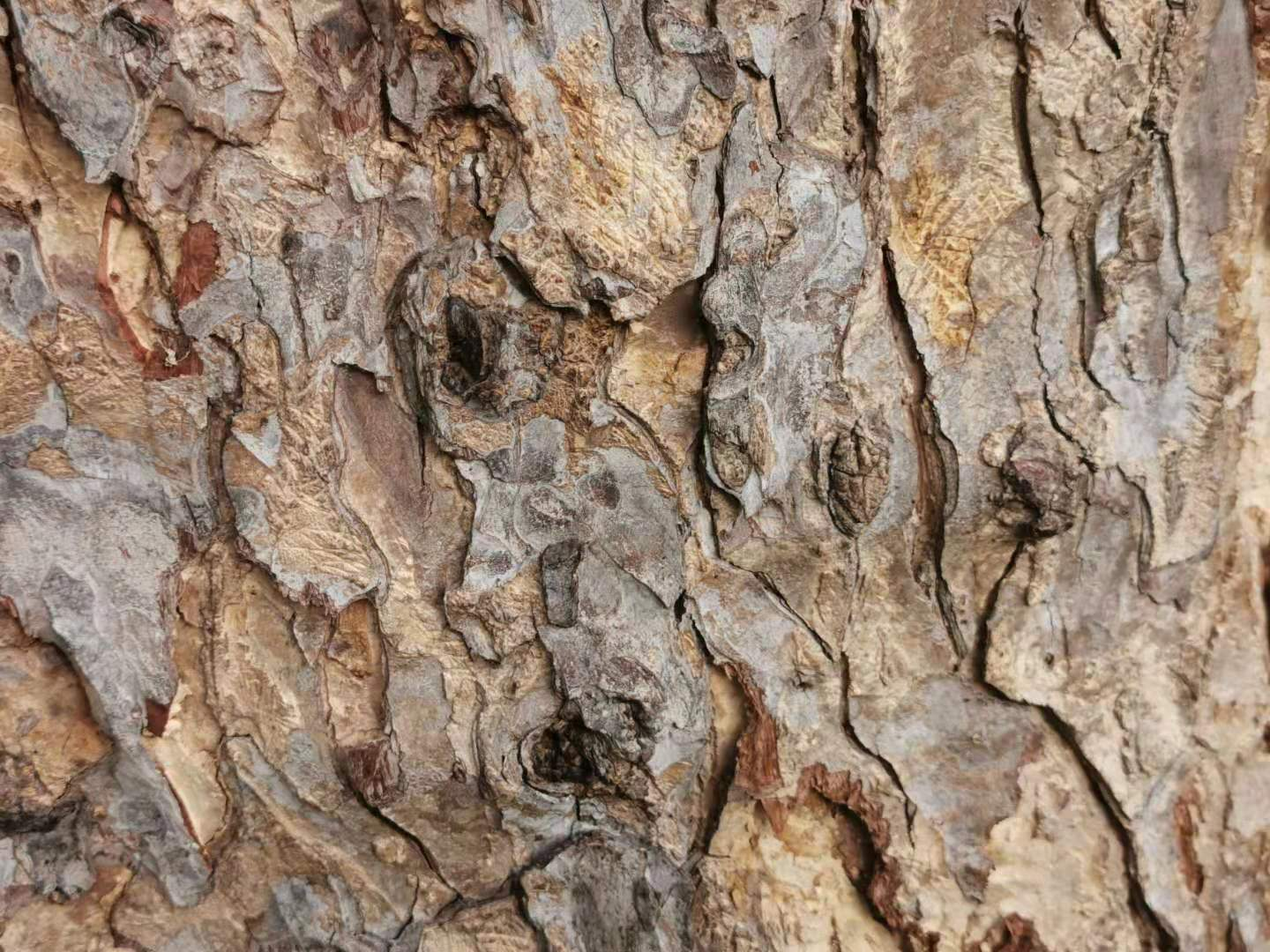
The old bark has a metallic luster. In 2016, the height of the tree was 15 meters and the bust circumference was 5.7 meters. Samanea saman

== See also ==
- Bark beetle
- Bark painting
- Trunk (botany)
- Bark isolate
- Bark-binding, a diseased condition of tree bark

== Other references ==
- Cédric Pollet, Bark: An Intimate Look at the World's Trees. London, Frances Lincoln, 2010. (Translated by Susan Berry) ISBN 978-0-7112-3137-5
