= Bark-binding =

- Symptoms: hardened bark, stunted growth
- Causes: livestock, parasites, restricted growth
- Treatment: cutting/scraping bark

Bark-binding is a disease in trees that causes the bark of the plant to become hardened and tough, restricting the growth of the trunk. It is caused by a sudden restriction of the tree's growth, the rubbing of livestock against the trunk, or by lichens and other parasites on the bark. It is possible to prevent the disease by keeping the tree away from animals and keeping it sprayed, thereby preventing the growth of parasites. It can be cured by slitting the bark, cutting it along the grain of the tree, or by scraping away all of the diseased bark.

== Bibliography ==
- Crabb, George. The Book of Knowledge: Or, An Explanation of Words and Things Connected with All the Arts... Leavitt & Allen. 1858.
- Lyon, Patrick (1816). A Treatise on the Physiology and Pathology of Trees: With Observations on the Barrenness and Canker of Fruit Trees. p. 121.
