= The Beast Within =

The Beast Within may refer to:

== Film ==
- The Beast Within (1911 film), a 1911 short silent film
- The Beast Within (1982 film), a 1982 horror film directed by Philippe Mora
- The Beast Within (1995 film), a 1995 film written and directed by Carsten Rudolf
- Virus Undead or Beast Within, a 2008 German horror film
- The Beast Within (2024 film), a 2024 horror film directed by Alexander J. Farrell

== Literature ==
- La Bête Humaine or The Beast Within, an 1890 novel by Émile Zola
- The Beast Within (novel), a 1981 novel by Edward Levy; basis for the film
- The Beast Within: A Gabriel Knight Mystery, a 1998 novel by Jane Jensen, a novelization of the eponymous computer game
- The Beast Within, a 2007 novel by Catherine MacPhail, the second installment in the Nemesis tetralogy
- The Beast Within, a 2011 by Lee Goldberg, William Rabkin and James Daniels, the seventh installment in The Dead Man series
- The Beast Within, a 2011 YA novel by Terry Spear
- The Beast Within: A Tale of Beauty's Prince, a 2014 YA novel based on Disney's Beauty and the Beast by Serena Valentino, the second installment in the Disney Villains series

== Music ==
- "The Beast Within" (song), a remix of the 1990 Madonna song "Justify My Love"
- Beast Within, a 2008 album by Katra

== Television ==
- "Beast Within", Roswell Conspiracies: Aliens, Myths and Legends episode 25 (2000)
- "The Beast Within", American Gothic episode 13 (1996)
- "The Beast Within", Beauty and the Beast season 1, episode 6 (1987)
- "The Beast Within", Iron Man season 2, episode 1 (1995)
- "The Beast Within", Lore season 1, episode 5 (2017)
- "The Beast Within", Monster Buster Club season 2, episodes 27–29 (2009)
- "The Beast Within", Poltergeist: The Legacy season 4, episode 22 (1999)
- "The Beast Within", Quantum Leap season 5, episode 19 (1993)
- "The Beast Within", Remedy season 1, episode 5 (2014)
- "The Beast Within", Scream Street series 1, episode 28 (2016)
- "The Beast Within", Shadowhunters season 3, episode 18 (2019)
- "The Beast Within", Street Fighter season 2, episode 10 (1997)
- "The Beast Within", Teen Titans season 3, episode 9 (2004)
- "The Beast Within", Teen Wolf season 1, episode 4 (1986)
- "The Beast Within", The Adventures of Sinbad season 1, episode 3 (1996)
- "The Beast Within", The Incredible Hulk (1978) season 1, episode 2 (1978)
- "The Beast Within", The Little Mermaid season 3, episode 6 (1994)
- "The Beast Within", The Lost World season 1, episode 10 (1999)
- "The Beast Within", The New Adventures of Zorro season 1, episode 4 (1997)
- "The Beast Within", Ultimate Muscle: The Kinnikuman Legacy season 2, episode 12 (2004)

== Other uses ==
- The Beast Within: A Gabriel Knight Mystery, a 1995 computer adventure game
- Vivisector: Beast Within, a 2005 first-person shooter computer game
- The Beast Within: The Making of Alien, a 2003 direct-to-video documentary about the 1979 film Alien featured in the Alien Quadrilogy DVD set

== See also ==
- "Beast from Within", an episode of Martin Mystery
- The Devil Within (disambiguation)
- The Evil Within (disambiguation)
- The Enemy Within (disambiguation)
- The Power Within (disambiguation)
