= The Evil Within (disambiguation) =

The Evil Within is a 2014 video game.

The Evil Within may also refer to:

== Film ==
- The Evil Within (1970 film), an Indian film
- The Evil Within, the American title for the 1990 film Baby Blood
- The Evil Within (2017 film), an American film

== Literature ==
- The Evil Within, a 1995 novel by Scott Ciencin, a novelization of the eponymous episode of the Wild C.A.T.s TV series
- The Evil Within, a 2010 novel by Nancy Holder
- The Evil Within, a 2017 novel by Catherine MacPhail

== Television ==
- "Ranma and the Evil Within", a 1990 episode of Ranma ½ season 3
- "The Evil Within", a 2006 episode of Blade: The Series
- "The Evil Within", a 1953 episode of Tales of Tomorrow
- "The Evil Within", a 1994 episode of Wild C.A.T.s
- "The Evil Within", a 2005 episode of Xiaolin Showdown

== See also ==
- The Beast Within (disambiguation)
- The Devil Within (disambiguation)
- The Enemy Within (disambiguation)
- The Power Within (disambiguation)
