= Terror in the Sky (disambiguation) =

Terror in the Sky is a 1971 U.S. telefilm.

Terror in the sky, terror from the skies, sky terror, or variant thereof, may refer to:

== Television ==
- Terror in the Skies, a series examining commercial aviation
- "Terror in the Sky" (Batman: The Animated Series), a 1992 episode
- "Terror from the Skies" (The Manhunter), a 1974 episode
- "Terror from the Sky" (Martin Mystery), a 2003 episode
- "Terror from the Sky" (MonsterQuest), a 2009 episode

== Other uses ==
- Terror in the Skies, a fantasy RPG book published by FASA from the Earthdawn game; see List of Earthdawn books
- "Terror from the Skies", radio episode 243 from 1993 of Adventures in Odyssey, see List of Adventures in Odyssey episodes
- Sky Terror, a 1972 film
- "Sky Terror", a 1942 film serial chapter from Captain Midnight
