= Monster Buster Club =

2000s animated series

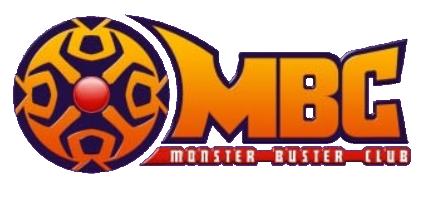
- Also known as: MBC - Chasseurs de monstres
- Genre: Action; Adventure; Comic science fiction Police procedural Science fantasy Monster of the week
- Created by: Vincent Chalvon-Demersay; David Michel
- Written by: John Derevlany (Eps. 1-26); Al Schwartz (Eps. 27-52)
- Directed by: Jean-Louis Vandestoc
- Voices of: Sonja Ball; Anna Cummer; Ian James Corlett; Matt Hill; Rick Jones; Andrea Libman; Kelly Sheridan; Tabitha St. Germain; Sam Vincent; Michael Yarmush
- Theme music composer: David Vadant; Noam Kaniel
- Composers: Jeff Fisher; Paul-Étienne Côté
- Countries of origin: France; Canada
- Original languages: French; English
- No. of seasons: 2
- No. of episodes: 52 (list of episodes)

Production
- Executive producers: Vincent Chalvon-Demersay; Sylain Viau
- Producers: Sylvain Viau; David Michel; Vincent Chalvon-Demersay
- Running time: 22 minutes
- Production companies: Marathon Media; Image Entertainment Corporation

Original release
- Network: TF1 (France); YTV (Canada); Jetix/Disney XD (Europe/USA)
- Release: October 29, 2007 – November 14, 2009

Monster Buster Club is a French-Canadian animated science fiction television series created by David Michel and Vincent Chalvon-Demersay, it was co-produced by Marathon Media, the animation studio Image Entertainment Corporation, Jetix Europe with YTV and TF1.

The series first aired on October 29, 2007 in France on TF1's block TFOU.

Most of the episodes were outsourced to Crest Animation Studios with Autodesk Maya. 52 episodes were produced.

== Premise ==
In a town named Singletown, three human preteens, with the help of their alien friend, reform the "Monster Buster Club" (often abbreviated as MBC), a secret organization that was founded centuries ago. The MBC aims to locate alien criminals, capture them, and send them to intergalactic authorities.

== Development and production ==
=== Mipcom Jr. 2006 ===
Monster Buster Club was first introduced to the public during Mipcom Jr. in October 2006. Marathon (now Zodiak Kids), the production company behind the show, presented their latest animated television series. Having experienced success with 2D shows like Totally Spies!, Martin Mystery, and Team Galaxy, Marathon aimed to venture into the realm of 3D animation. The show received significant attention at Mipcom Jr., becoming the most viewed French program and ranking as the sixth most-watched overall.

=== The (lost) pilot ===
While exploring the director Jean-Louis Vandestoc's blog, intriguing information about the early development of Monster Buster Club came to light. It was revealed that a pilot episode of the show had been created by a different CGI animation studio in 2005, predating Marathon's involvement. Unfortunately, details about the studio responsible for the pilot remain unknown. Despite thorough web research, no concrete information or traces of the pilot could be found. However, Vandestoc mentioned that some images from the pilot were previously accessible on the official Monster Buster Club website before the show's premiere in France. Contacting the show's producers might be the only way to obtain screenshots or further details about the lost pilot.

=== Co-production and budget ===
Monster Buster Club was a collaborative effort between Marathon Media, Mystery Animation, Jetix Europe, TF1, and YTV. The production of the show required a substantial budget, amounting to approximately 23 million dollars. This significant investment underscores the scale and ambition associated with bringing the series to life.

=== Animation development ===
To initiate the production process and establish the show's distinctive artistic style, Max Maléo, the animation supervisor, traveled to India. His primary objectives included defining the visual direction of the series and refining the parameters for animation. Notably, the animators at Crest Animation, the Indian animation studio involved in the project, initially expressed a desire to incorporate "Matrix-like scenes" into the show. However, Marathon successfully persuaded Crest Animation to adopt a stylistic approach inspired by Disney and Japanese anime, aligning with their creative vision for Monster Buster Club. Determining a cohesive style proved challenging due to the differing cultural references between India and France, as exemplified by the contrasting popularity of Dragon Ball in the two countries.

=== Notable production details ===
Crest Animation showcased their expertise by successfully animating large crowds in two episodes of Monster Buster Club: the first and eighth episodes of the first season. It's worth mentioning that before Jean-Louis Vandestoc assumed the role of director, the previous director had already approved the scripts for the initial 16 episodes. Consequently, Vandestoc was unable to introduce new scripts due to his dissatisfaction with the existing ones.

== Episodes ==
Season	Episodes	Originally released	
Season	Episodes	First released	Last released
1	26	October 29, 2007	December 8, 2008
2	26	January 15, 2009	November 14, 2009

== Characters ==
=== Main ===
- Cathy Smith (voiced by Andrea Libman) appears to be a bubbly, enthusiastic 12-year-old girl, but is actually a 250-year-old (although season 2 episode 1's subplot is about her 700th birthday) alien from the planet Rhapsodia. She came to Earth with her grandfather, Mr. Smith, to start the Monster Buster Club (MBC). She is constantly surprised at how different Earth is from Rhapsodia, and has many superhuman abilities, such as elasticity and slight telekinesis, among others. In her human form, she has blond hair and blue eyes. Her Rhapsodian form is shown to be a humanoid white alien with scattered pink spots, four tentacles for arms, two tentacles for legs, tentacles on her head (analogous to hair), and a long, furry-looking tail. (Note: In one episode, Cathy mentions that her alien form has tentacles, and later on her full alien form is revealed.) Her suit color is pink.
- Chris (voiced by Samuel Vincent) is an intelligent, resourceful 12-year-old boy and the tech genius of the group. He has indigo-blue hair and dark blue eyes. He possesses a knack for gadgets and will often stay back in the clubhouse to supply intelligence reports while the rest of the group is on a mission. He has a younger brother named John. His suit color is blue.
- Danny Jackson (voiced by Matt Hill) is an athletic, hot-headed but nice 12-year-old boy who gets overconfident at times. He has brown hair, green eyes, and a scar over his left eyebrow. He has an erratic sense of humor and enjoys cracking jokes, even in dangerous situations. He has his own self-proclaimed nickname, "The Danny," and refers to himself as such. He has an unrequited crush on his classmate, Wendy. His suit color is red.
- Sam (voiced by Anna Cummer) is a responsible, level-headed 12-year-old girl who is the de facto (albeit unofficial) leader of the MBC. She has dark hair tied in buns and hazel eyes. She is the "shoot first, ask questions later" type, and will often prioritize missions over having fun. Though her friends can sometimes get annoyed at her assertiveness, she is shown to have a soft side and care for their safety. Her suit color is yellow.
- John (voiced by Tabitha St. Germain) is the enthusiastic 10-year-old brother of Chris. He sometimes takes over for Chris at the clubhouse when Chris is on a mission or otherwise occupied. He frequently expresses desire to be considered an "official" member of the MBC, though the group's members consider him too young.
- Mr. Hugo Smith (voiced by Rick Jones) is Cathy's aloof grandfather who came with her to Earth. Like his granddaughter, he is a Rhapsodian but rarely displays any supernatural powers. His alien form resembles a mollusk. He will occasionally aid the MBC from the clubhouse, but is often entirely uninvolved with their missions. He enjoys working in his garden and playing cards with his plants.

=== Other students ===
- Wendy (voiced by Tabitha St. Germain) is an attractive, popular 13-year-old valley girl at Singletown Middle School. She has a dog named Matisse. She doesn't reciprocate Danny's romantic feelings toward her, but takes advantage of them to get him to do favors. Though she frequently spreads gossip and makes fun of other students, she is shown to have moments of kindness.
- Jeremy Flablotnick (voiced by Samuel Vincent) is a nerdy 12-year-old boy. He is friends with Chris and a member of the computer club with him. He has a crush on Cathy, who hates him.
- Mark (voiced by Ian James Corlett) is a snobby 13-year-old who is the richest boy in Singletown and Danny's rival. He uses his wealth to attain popularity.

=== Faculty ===
- Mr. Fusster (voiced by Ian James Corlett) is a science teacher at Singletown Middle School. He adamantly believes that aliens don't exist; this upsets Cathy, and she often argues with him on the subject, which gets her in trouble. (Note: shown in the episode "The Trouble with Troublemaking", when Cathy gets angry and pushes all his books off his desk getting her a detention) Later in the show, it is implied that he may know more about aliens than he lets on, and might even be one himself.
- Principal Rollins (voiced by Sonja Ball) is the authoritative principal of Singletown Middle School. She acts as if she is a military commander and the students are soldiers, frequently using drill commands like "Company halt!" and "About-face!". Sometimes, she gets in the way of the MBC's missions. (Note: this is shown in the episode "Monster Beaters" when she forces every student to join a school club, leaving the MBC little time to investigate) She shows affection for Mr. Smith, but suspects that Cathy is some sort of spy.

=== Others ===
- Matisse is Wendy's dog.
- Mr. Beady (voiced by John Stocker) is a gruff, short-tempered man who runs the Happy Mart, a general store in Singletown.
- Ceaser XY, better known as Speedy, is a speed morpher alien resembling an anthropomorphic cheetah who can run at extreme speeds. Initially apprehended as a thief, he serves as an affiliate to the MBC during the occasional operation.

== Broadcast ==
Besides Jetix internationally, the series has also been broadcast on several other networks:

- In France, the show was first aired on TF1 and later on Disney XD and Gulli.
- In Canada, the show aired on YTV.
- In the United Kingdom, as well as Jetix, the series was aired on the GMTV-owned (which Disney held a 25% stake in at the time) Toonattik strand, which itself aired on ITV1 and the CITV channel.
- In the Arab world, the show aired on Al Jazeera Children's Channel (JCC)/Jeem TV, who aired other Jetix programming.
- In Israel, the show aired on Arutz HaYeladim.
- In the rest of Asia (including the Middle East, the Indian subcontinent, Southeast Asia and Greater China), the show aired on Disney Channel, who aired other Jetix programming.
- In the Philippines, the show aired on Q (now known as GTV).
- In Indonesia, the show aired on RTV.
- In Hong Kong, the show aired on the country's English speaking television network TVB Pearl.
- In Singapore, the show aired on the subscription video on demand service Toggle (now known as meWATCH).
- In Malaysia, the show aired on TV3 as part of their Bananana! programming block.
- In Ireland, the show aired on RTÉ2 as part of the long running children's strand The Den.
