= The Devil Within =

The Devil Within may refer to:

- The Devil Within (manga) by Ryo Takagi
- The Devil Within (1921 film), an American film directed by Bernard J. Durning
- The Devil Within (2010 film), an American film directed by Tom Hardy
- The Devil Within (2026 film), a Spanish-Uruguayan thriller film
- "The Devil Within", a song by Brandon Yates from Death Battle, 2025

== See also ==
- The Evil Within (disambiguation)
