= The Enemy Inside =

The Enemy Inside may refer to:

- The Enemy Inside (Arctic Plateau album) or the title song, 2012
- The Enemy Inside (Coldrain album), 2011
- "The Enemy Inside" (Dream Theater song), 2013
- Enemy Inside, a German rock band

== See also ==
- The Enemy Within (disambiguation)
