= Walter and Tandoori =

2005 French-Canadian TV series or program

- Created by: Marcel-Romain Thériault; Sylvain Viau
- Directed by: Daniel Decelles; Thomas LaPierre
- Voices of: Rick Jones
- Countries of origin: France; Canada
- No. of seasons: 2
- No. of episodes: 104

Production
- Executive producer: Sylvain Viau
- Producer: Sylvain Viau
- Running time: 11 minutes
- Production companies: Image Entertainment Corporation; Oasis Entertainment

Original release
- Network: TV5 Québec Canada
- Release: July 23, 2005 – September 24, 2010

Related
- Walter & Tandoori's Christmas

Walter and Tandoori, also known as Walter or Walter's World, is an animated children's series produced by Image Entertainment Corporation. The series centres on Walter, an inventor and fix-it specialist, and his friend Tandoori, a hyperactive chicken, who live together in the village of Trois-Montagnes (in the French version) or Hart's Landing (in the English version), and embark on various adventures designed to teach children about the environment and ecology.

== Production ==
Created by Sylvain Viau for Image Entertainment Corporation, the series first aired on TV5 Québec Canada under the Walter title in 2005. It had its roots in Mr. Ecolo, a live-action short film which Viau produced for the National Film Board in 1997.

The series has since aired on a number of other broadcast networks, including Ici Radio-Canada Télé, Télé-Québec, Vrak.TV, Unis and Cartoon Network Latin America. The series won a Prix Gémeaux for Best Animated Program or Series in 2011.

Walter 100%, a "hybrid" series of 26 half-hour episodes which mixed animation with live-action, was also later created. In addition, the series has also produced cross-platform features for the web, including the shorter web series version Walter's World and interactive children's games, as well as being franchised to books by children's author Bryan Perro and a pedagogical package on the environment for use in schools.

== Walter & Tandoori's Christmas ==
In 2011, a Christmas-themed film, Walter & Tandoori's Christmas, was also released. The film was released in separate French and English versions, with a French voice cast that included Benoît Brière, Michel Courtemanche, Bianca Gervais, Rick Jones and Benoît Rousseau, and an English voice cast that included Sonja Ball, Rick Jones, Russell Peters and Philip le Maistre.

The film also received a limited theatrical release outside of Canada, including a screening at the Festival International du Film Francophone de Namur in September 2012, and a brief run in Los Angeles in December of that year in an unsuccessful attempt to garner an Academy Award nomination for Best Animated Feature.
