= List of Monster Buster Club episodes =

Monster Buster Club is a children's animated science fiction television series co-produced by French company Marathon Media and Canadian animation studio Image Entertainment Corporation.The series follows the adventures of three human preteens and their alien friend who reform a secret organization known as the "Monster Buster Club" (or MBC) to locate and capture alien criminals in their town. Originally airing from 2007 to 2009, the show ended its run with a total of 2 seasons and 52 episodes.

== Series overview ==
Season	Episodes	Originally released	
Season	Episodes	First released	Last released
1	26	October 29, 2007	December 8, 2008
2	26	January 15, 2009	November 14, 2009

== Episodes ==
=== Season 1 (2007–08) ===
Italy #	USA #	Title	Original air date	Production code
1	2	"Ragazzi Popolari" ("Popular Kids")	October 29, 2007	102
A new girl name Jenny comes to school and turns out to be an octo-alien, so the MBC Members must put an end to her. Note: On Disney Channel Asia, this was the first episode broadcast.
2	1	"Mindreader"	June 2, 2008	101
Cathy's cousin Elton comes to visit. The rest of The MBC Members discover he is a mind reader and he uses his power to annoy and embarrass them. The MBC Members later find out that Pincher-Bots are after Elton and they must protect him.
3	3	"Wrong Number"	June 4, 2008	103
Hugo is appointed a job in which he has to make peace between two planets before they go to war. He is given a galactic communicator that looks like a cellphone. Due to Chris' curiosity, he takes the communicator and loses it when he crashes into Mark and the devices get mixed up. Mark keeps getting the calls meant for Hugo and insults Zubin. The two planets go to war on Earth. Soon after the space ships arrive, Chris and Cathy get back the communicator and make peace between the planets.
4	4	"Snack Time"	June 5, 2008	104
Sam helps babysit toddler Tina, a Pythenor Eater alien, for Cathy while she still has to help with the bake sale benefiting hungry whales with Chris and Danny, making her go back and forth to each job. With all the stress, Sam accidentally feeds Tina Glusock crackers, an alien food that Pythenor Eaters shouldn't eat because it puts them on an eating rampage! Meanwhile, Chris and Danny are having trouble with Mark's Everyday Airlift Bake Sale raising money for Mark to have a helicopter. Tina gets to the school and starts eating all the bake sale goods but is momentarily stopped by a Floater Disk, but she can even eat food without touching it. Hugo tells them that the only way to stop this rampage is to get the taste of Glusock out of her mouth, so they use John's "Dumdy Dum" delectable dispenser, which produces bad tasting cookies and stops the little Pythenor Eater.
5	5	"The Trouble with Troublemaking"	June 6, 2008	105
Cathy gets detention when she fights with Mr. Fusster about intelligent life other than humans. The detention teacher is Mr. Gluten and it turns out to be a Sticky glue alien. To solve this problem, Danny says to fight the alien they should all get detention, which Chris and Sam don't like since they never get detention, unlike Danny. Chris shows up the next day with a gangster look, but still is finding trouble getting detention. Cathy and Sam look for Mr. Gluten's file and escape once they find it. At lunch, Mr. Gluten turns into the lunch lady and Chris and Danny call for help. When Mr. Gluten escapes, Sam tackles the real lunch lady and gets detention. At detention, Sam finds out the real Mr. Gluten is on vacation. When the Sticky attacks and tells Cathy and Sam he is recruiting alien workers and that he is gathering Rhapsodians A.K.A., Cathy to work for him. Just as he is about to capture Cathy, the boys throw a stink bomb and the Sticky escapes into the forest. The MBC Members follow him and stop him by using a Rhapsodian puzzle stick that Danny sets between two trees to trip him and knock him down. Chris hacks into the student files and clears their detentions, so that Cathy and Sam have clear student records.
6	6	"Dog Daze"	June 9, 2008	106
Wendy asks Danny to look after her dog named Matisse, while she is on a trip to the mountains. In order to impress Wendy, Danny signs Matisse to behavior-correction school where Matisse is replaced with moto-dog, things start to get complicated and it's up to The MBC Members to save Single Town from Matisse moto-clones.
7	7	"Flower King"	June 10, 2008	107
The MBC Members Members get a new mission. They must guard The Flower King named Petalia XIV, who is in the form of a flower until ambassadors from his planet arrive. Meanwhile, Jeremy is trying to impress Cathy by presenting her a flower. He accidentally mistakes Petalia for one and kidnaps him. Now, the MBC Members have to deal with both robots sent to capture Petalia and finding Petalia himself.
8	8	"Battle of the Bands"	June 11, 2008	108
Several tweens in Single Town including Ralph, Danny and Wendy were found robbing local shops. Soon, The MBC Members realize that all robbers were hypnotized during the recent concert of a band called "The Flying Dutchmen." Now, they must become a band to participate in upcoming concert and put an end to the hypnotic music.
9	10	"World's Toughest Kid"	June 12, 2008	110
The MBC Members try to use the interplanetary transporter to send several captured aliens to the galactic authorities, which requires the retinal scan of all of The MBC Members to complete, but Danny is running late. The transport fails, which results in a battle with accidentally freed aliens. Meanwhile, Cathy proposes herself, with Sam's help, for a Student Council President, but both she and Danny, in a matter of coolness, face opposition of new tough schoolboy, Brian. Now, it is up to The MBC Members to investigate why Brian challenged Danny and Cathy.
10	9	"Acting Out"	June 13, 2008	109
In the cafe, The MBC Members fights a lizard-like alien, who is trying to kill a stylish guy. The lizard alien escapes, and The MBC Members meet Stanley Caminski, one of the galaxy's most successful superstar manager. For saving his life he explains that attacking alien was his unsuccessful competitor, whose stars aren't popular. Stanley offers The MBC Members his assistance so they can become stars too. Everyone agrees, but Hugo says no, because Monster Buster Club is a secret society and must not be revealed. Chris, however, secretly calls Stanley and agrees to participate in commercials. Meanwhile, Cathy auditions for the school play, "Romeo and Juliet" and turns out to be an amazing actress, so she wins the part and must prepare for opening night. Wedge, the lizard alien, is looking to kill every superstar who works with Stanley. Now, with Cathy too busy, and obsessed, preparing for the school play, and Chris not wanting to believe that Wedge is after him, it is up to Sam, Danny and John to find Wedge before he strikes.
11	13	"Monster Beaters"	July 14, 2008	113
John tries to convince The MBC Members, including his older brother, Chris, to allow him to join, but they reject him because he is too young. However, a new monster fighters club called "Monster Beaters" appears in Single Town and John is welcome to join them. Meanwhile, the school opens several new after school classes or clubs and everyone must join one of them; Sam and Danny get into knitting club; Cathy is assigned to science club; Chris forced to visit a tap dancing club. The MBC Members soon get to the truth about the Monster Beaters – they're aliens. John, however, doesn't believe Chris and continues to work with Monsters Beaters. Will The MBC Members be able to save John from the aliens before it's too late?
12	12	"Comic Book Heroes"	July 15, 2008	112
Cathy and Sam are angry about seeing so few comic books about women. While a mysterious man runs out of the local comic book shop, they pursue him but he gets away. Meanwhile a strange new boy appears at their school, trying to make kids follow his orders to prepare all his comic book collection from the other planet to be stored on the Earth, making Sam follow his orders too. With Cathy busy imitating one of the comic book heroines, will The MBC Members be able to save kids from the mysterious boy alien?
13	16	"Statue of Limitations"	July 16, 2008	116
Sam volunteers to prepare a celebration of the day, when city was founded by a man named Addison Single. Cathy, however, proclaims Addison was an alien who tried to make this city for aliens. Sam refuses to believe it, but soon deep in the abandoned MBC storage beneath their clubhouse, where Chris accidentally activates a violet gemstone bringing the statue of Addison Single to life, which is revealed later that it is not a statue, it's the founder himself. Now The MBC Members must stop the statue from turning all citizens into stone, while keeping them busy so that they will not notice. Note: On Disney Channel Asia, this was the 16th episode broadcast. The title is an obvious opposite-reference to the Statue of Liberty in New York City.
14	17	"Pipe Dreams"	July 17, 2008	117
The MBC Members take a fun-ride through the tunnels when the pipes begin to shake. However, they discover that road workers are causing it, but soon they turn out to be following new plans for digging new sewers. Meanwhile, Mr. Fusster takes the class sightseeing in the sewers. The MBC Members realize that class may discover club's tunnels which intersects with the sewers. Sam decides to scare everyone off so their club will remain undiscovered. However, things get worse when the strange "road worker" turns out to be an alien who tries to "suck" the entire town into the big prototype of MBC's tractor beam using the club's net of tunnels. Will The MBC Members be able to stop him before he succeeds? Note: On Disney Channel Asia, this was the 17th episode broadcast. MBC's underground net of tunnels is shown to be intersected with the sewers in several spots. The only thing that keeps more or less hidden is the holo-shield.
15	14	"Aliens on the Fast Track"	July 18, 2008	114
Chris has a part time job spring cleaning a shop. His boss nags him to make sure he finish or he'll be fired. Meanwhile, his friends come in to visit and suddenly their communicators detects an alien coming into the shop and The MBC Members try to power up, but they are not as fast as him. In only a few seconds, all items in the shop disappear and his boss nags him again and suspects that his friends stole all the items and must either get all the items back to the shop or pay for them by 6 pm or else he'll be in big trouble. A second later, Danny's video game is also stolen. Soon after that Sam, Danny and Cathy are going for a part time job try to repay the money for the stolen items, but later, all of Single Town's electronic devices disappear, including the MBC container! Can The MBC Members find this Speed Morpher alien before Single Town is in chaos? Note: On Disney Channel Asia, this was the 13th episode broadcast.
16	11	"Secret Santa"	November 3, 2008	111
It is time to start a snow holiday and Chris, who loves the winter holidays, tries to figure out what kind of present he is going to get. Cathy doesn't know about Santa because she does not know that Earth also has snow day. Trouble comes in the form of Roy's present when it is revealed that it is a tracker planted by Dingle, an alien disguised as a Santa who is trying to bring all the kids, including Sam, to an old air container, making it look like he is trying to take the kids hostage. But afterwards, it is revealed that Dingle was just trying to get the kids to accept his presents. Note: On Disney Channel Asia, this was the 14th episode broadcast.
17	15	"The Bugaboos"	July 22, 2008	115
It is a good afternoon and everyone is coming out for a walk and to study. Danny is skateboarding and showing off while Chris is working on his project, thinking he can finish before night falls. A bug scout sees everyone and Chris tries to drive him away. The bug ends up throwing him and causing an accident with Danny on the skateboard park, making Mark laugh at him. Soon, as they walk down the street, a swarm of bugs attacks The MBC Members. Danny catches a General bug, named General Louse but the swarm continue to attack forcing them to retreat back to their club house. Cathy tells everyone that Hugo is seeing Principal Rollins and she thinks she'll be getting detention. On the street, they are attacked by a swarm of bugs again. After a while, it reveals it's an alien bug and The MBC Members find out that their bug queen is coming to lay her eggs. Can they stop the queen before she arrives? Note: On Disney Channel Asia, this was the 15th episode broadcast.
18	18	"The Forget-Me-Stone"	September 29, 2008	118
One single night in the Single Town, Hugo and his plant playing a cards game in his house when there's trouble, an alien called Glor Glenemore is almost in the house just not fast as when the alarm sounds and The MBC Members find him, trying to stop getting him to Hugo's house but he escapes. In the minutes later a transmission from Zubin, which you can see in episode of "Wrong number," who contracts them for the most important thing in galaxy, The Forget-Me-Stone, which must return to Zubin for much greatest security to protect it for prevent be stolen matter what it take and say is that Glor Glenemore is the same as he tries to break into Hugo's house and steal the stone. But Hugo tells them that he has hidden the stone and doesn't remember where he put it, so The MBC Members have no choice but help him and find the stone for the whole night. After not finding The Forget-Me-Stone, Danny, Cathy and Sam fall asleep. Chris keeps looking for it and finally, it is in the fridge in the Rhapsodia snack drink and as Chris throws and wash all the snack drink all the way below the pipes when finishing, he takes the stone back to the club house. Suddenly the stone actives itself and erases all his memories and goes to sleep. In the morning, Sam wakes up and is almost late for school. She immediately wakes Danny and Cathy, finding Chris ready for school. but the situation becomes even worse when Chris shows Jeremy to the club and accidentally activates the switch to the main club house headquarters. Despite Jeremy has reveal The MBC, he helps them track down the Glor Glenemore, who tries stealing The Forget-Me-Stone, The MBC Members quickly head the way and bust him down, but he HAS the stone and escapes again but suddenly he drops it in the middle of Single Town Middle School. School is about to start when suddenly Mark finds the stone and touches it, erasing his memories and even worse when he brings to school and lets everybody in the school touch it and erase their memories. Can the MBC members track down Glor Glenemore and help everyone to recover their memories every people before all is turned into chaos?
19	20	"Camping Out"	October 6, 2008	120
It is another single night in Single Town while the MBC Members are chasing a small Robotic machine, that he has stolen electronic devices with the car, while only halfway into the chase, their arsenal has no more power so the small Robotic machine escapes. When they're back at their club house, the power is very low and Sam shuts it off or else no more power to recover it, but it will take more than a month to recover it. She worries that there will doom if it doesn't recover in less than a week, the whole world will be the alien's home. Suddenly, Hugo invites the MBC Members, including his granddaughter, Cathy, to go camping. So they go to Rocky Mountains Hill, to find an energy flower which can restore the club in full power. The Mobato Flower which only grows every four centuries. When it is night they rest for camping, Danny tells a ghost story and suddenly in the night a monster appears at their camping zone and eats everything in the backpack. The MBC Members try to drive him away. In the end it freaks out and is scared away by a Rhapsodian flame bolt. In the morning, they continue their search for the flower without their gadgets, they have to face a great challenge: to cross the mountains and for the first time facing a dangerous Mobato mission without any weapons to protect themselves, they must overcome the upcoming monster who they have encountered last night only with their talent and skill to protect themselves. They cross mountain after mountain, they are very tired; except for Hugo, who has a Rhapsodian air mattress. Finally, they reach the mountains which they want to claim the Mobato Flower, but the monster reaches there first and tries to claim it, The MBC Members has no choice but to fight and distract the monster to claim the flower afterwards. The monster revealed just a paper machine with a small Robotic machine which has stolen the electronics from Single Town and tries to claim it no matter what it takes. But in the end, The MBC Members bring back the flower to restore their club to normal.
20	19	"Trick or Treat... or Alien"	October 13, 2008	119
It's Halloween and all the kids in Single Town are going trick-or-treating. Mark challenges Danny to go into the haunted house alone. In the end, Danny would be the first kid inside the haunted house. When he goes inside, there are a lot of spooky things happening to him: books flying around, the wall moving itself, he goes into the room and was trapped by the sticky on the floor. He tried to escape, but it didn't work. He alerts the other MBC members to save him. While Danny is trapped inside the haunted house, Chris, Sam and Cathy are going Trick or Treating, when suddenly their communicators get a transmission from Danny. They speed their way to the haunted house to save him. Finally, they reach Danny and try to save by using arsenal to break free from the sticky, which he has hold. When suddenly the floor is alive by itself, everyone is trying to get ready for battle, but after a while it reveals itself as a giant alien pet dog named Moppy, who has been lost on earth many years ago. The aliens of the Nix pet told them about the situation, his pet puppy's space ship only arrives on Halloween for their return to their planet. If this year ends they have to wait another year and he tells The MBC Members that the spaceship arrives somewhere in the single people home swimming pool. So The MBC Members hurry up and carry Moppy, and speed their way to the space ship with the help of John, they're aware of people in Single Town will see the alien's pet dog. After all a long way, they finally reach the pool, but Moppy refused to go in the space ship. So, Danny uses his skill to attract the dog to space ship, Nix is very proud of The MBC Members and thanks them for bringing back his pet to their space ship. He will meet them again on another Halloween and they fly back to their planet.
21	21	"A Matter of Principals"	October 20, 2008	121
Danny is picked to be principal for the day, and has great ideas on how to improve the school. However, an evil dinosaur-like alien pretends to be Wendy, and attacks Chris and Cathy. Meanwhile, Sam is trapped by the real Wendy, who wants to be 'Miss First Aid of Single Town Middle School' when she falls over while running after her bus.
22	30	"Sore Winner"	July 7, 2008	130
A game-obsessed alien (Proskar) comes to Earth, to find a game board called 'Parchugal', and The MBC Members find weird symbols in the ground. The alien then comes and tries to take the town square away.
23	22	"Beware of Frogs"	October 27, 2008	122
A mutated Earth frog (Herptilius) comes to Earth to seek vengeance on a chef that nearly cooked him years ago. Coincidentally, the chef turns out to be a replacement of Mr. Fusster (Who is on holiday) for science. The MBC Members must stop the frog, but he's invincible against anything, apart his weakness of Earth flies.
24	23	"Outcracker's Badland Galaxy Tour"	November 11, 2008	123
Cathy invites her favorite TV star to Earth (Outcracker), who tries to get good footage of dangerous stunts, which is disastrous. First, he tries to attack Mark with a robot Juice machine. Then, he has Wendy holding on for dear life when he takes off the bottom of her hot air balloon. Danny then jumps from the car in the air and saves Wendy the 'Old Fashioned way.' After that, he releases an army of camerabots at the satellite station.
25	24	"The End of Everything (Part 1)"	December 8, 2008	124
The MBC Members have to replace Hugo (as he is teaching a group of aliens how to fit in on Earth) whilst he is in an important meeting with Zubin, but before that, one of them (Nosidda) saves Chris, Danny and Sam from being driven into Outer Space. One of the other aliens is always on his V-Com (Zeborg), making them all suspicious, so they take his V-Com. Cathy is then given a strange flower, and falls in love with Jeremy, but The MBC Members get more suspicious of the other alien. They then receive a distress call from Cathy, while in her Rhapsodian and don't know who it is, so Sam and Chris go after Cathy, not knowing it is Cathy. They then see aliens not being able to morph, and realize too late that the alien really is Cathy, and now she isn't allowed back on Earth.
26	25	"The End of Everything (Part 2)"	December 8, 2008	125
Cathy is stuck in a container, and can't morph because of her forever flower, but refuses to take it off. Meanwhile, Elton comes to Earth to take Cathy's place. Chris then shows them who really was behind all of this, Nosidda, who is using his rescue of The MBC Members to make them think that he is a good alien. It turns out, Nosidda is Addison spelled backwards, and he is really the son of the late villainous founder, Addison Single, planning on making his late father's dream come true: making Earth the perfect planet for aliens. Meanwhile, Cathy finally takes off the forever flower and heads back to Earth to save her friends.

=== Season 2 (2009) ===
UK/Canada #	USA #	Title	Original air date	Production code
27	29	"The New Recruits"	February 7, 2009	129
Cathy turns 700 on Earth and gets excited and hopes that there will be a party. That evening, The MBC Members are trying to bust a monster, but it escapes because of Danny and Sam. The next day, two new recruits arrives and they quickly befriend Chris and Cathy, leaving Danny and Sam jealous. The MBC Members, except Cathy, and the recruits soon learn about a surprise party which will be thrown for Cathy from Hugo. Later, Danny and Sam realize the recruits are attempting to replace them so they find a way to let Chris and Cathy realize the truth before it was too late.
28	26	"Bubble Heads"	January 15, 2009	126
Another single night, at the owner of the shop, the owner of the shop carry his new stuff after arrive of the vent. Suddenly a tiny size of comics land in outside the vent it was a space ship. The shop owner notices so he carries the ship to the shop. The next morning, The MBC Members go into that shop try to see some stuff in the end, Danny buys the space ship gum and they head off for school. Danny blows a big-big bubble to impress the school. Mark becomes jealous towards him so he challenges him to blow big bubble and he ends up embarrassed. Danny chews the gum enough and throws into the throw can and The MBC Members surprise that gum came to alive and try to take Single Town.
29	31	"Me Krog, You Rollins"	February 14, 2009	131
At Single Town Middle School, everything is fine until a human-like alien primitive caveman comes to earth and tries to take Principal Rollins as his loved one.
30	32	"Cloudy with a Change of Jellynerps"	February 21, 2009	132
It's a good afternoon, the sky is pink and Hugo's garden plant isn't feeling so well, including his beloved plant who he plays cards with him. Meanwhile at Single Town Middle School, The MBC Members are going back to the clubhouse after all the stressful lessons. Suddenly, an alien Jellyfish tries to eat every electronic device. Can they stop this alien before it's too late?
31	33	"The Destiny Puzzle"	February 28, 2009	133
It's nighttime on Earth, and an alien spaceship comes. Inside is an alien Grandpa Octovore, the husband of Grandma Octovore. He comes to unload The Destiny Puzzle to Hugo's garden. Next morning, The MBC Members try to help Hugo to clean his garden. Suddenly, Chris scans the ground and the scanner finds something. Cathy lifts the puzzle up to the surface and takes into the club house for more information. Eventually, the puzzle activates and tells The MBC Members about a secret weapon hidden in the town. Now they have to find the weapon before Grandpa Octovore has a chance.
32	34	"Lizard's Tails"	March 4, 2009	134
One afternoon at the school gym, The MBC Members are playing basketball against each other. Suddenly, the basketball turns into an alien. It's a Reptilian Morpher, so they gear up to fight him. In the end, The MBC Members busts the alien. In school, Mr. Fusster teaches them and other students what an Iguana is. Afterwards in the clubhouse, Danny tries to send the bad aliens to the Galactic Authorities. Somehow, Reptilian frees himself and switch bodies with Danny. Now Danny must find a way to warn his friends about Reptilian!
33	35	"Fitness Freak"	March 11, 2009	135
It's a great summer morning and The MBC Members are relaxing until they find a frozen pond as they feel suspicious. Wendy invites Cathy to her slumber party but her other friends don't show due to the cold climate. Chris and Sam discover an eater alien called Pizmo caused the falling temperature because he doesn't want to be called lazy and he wants to be fit. But they need Cathy to stop him so Danny goes to bring her back. There Cathy and Danny find that the machine that causing the coldness is Wendy's house and that her bed is the control system. Then Cathy and Danny together stop it.
34	36	"The Beast Within"	March 13, 2009	136
It starts with Hugo giving orders to Danny, Cathy and Sam to get hold of his Rhapsodian grass. An alien then watches Cathy from distance. At school, the gang is helping Cathy to hide from Jeremy and Danny is really angry at Jeremy for following Cathy everywhere. Sam is forced to be Mark's slave. Then the beast attacks Hugo and the gang (except Sam) goes for his help. Then Danny helps Cathy to stay away from Jeremy and realizes that Jeremy has been turned into the beast.
35	37	"Frogs in Space"	March 16, 2009	137
Herptilius returns from galactic prison and seeks out The MBC Members for revenge. Back at the clubhouse, Sam and Cathy come with a busted alien and are told they have won a spaceship. Sam and Cathy also have pizzas delivered, but there are anchovies on the pizza, and no-one ordered anchovies. The spaceship arrives, and Sam and Cathy pick up Chris and Danny in the spaceship. But the spaceship is actually a trap set by Herptilius. John asks Sam and Chris if he can have a ride in the ship, and Sam says he can become an honorary MBC member for half an hour, so they set off. Sam, Chris, Danny and John are launched into outer-space, because Cathy accidentally eats a slice, setting off an allergy that makes her stick to anything she touches. The spaceship is captured by Herptilius, and Sam, Chris, Danny and John are cuffed. Meanwhile, Jeremy comes over to Cathy's backyard, and tries to hold hands with her. Unfortunately, her hand is stuck to Jeremy's while Hugo tries to find an antidote to Cathy's allergy. The frogs on the spaceship accidentally free Chris and Sam, who escape down to try to find the controls. They then try to send an SOS to Cathy, and Cathy shows the SOS to Hugo. Chris and Sam are re-captured. Jeremy helps Cathy out by using his 'Super Computer' to try to see what's going on in the spaceship. Cathy pretends it's a computer game and tells Jeremy she will give him a kiss on the cheek if he manages to keep the spaceship intact and manages to help Sam, Chris, Danny and John to get free of the cuffs and defeat Herptilius. John tells Sam, Chris and Danny about a video game he keeps on talking about, and that his cheats on it actually work in real life, so he is free of the handcuffs. Danny, Chris and Sam try this and become free of the handcuffs, and Cathy sends out a flashing code, which The MBC Members. Sam then plans out a plan to break free of the beam that keeps them floating in the air, which succeeds, and Chris grabs Herptilius' staff, but then Jeremy makes the other 'unmanned spaceships' bash into the spaceship, and this knocks everybody to the ground but Danny, who whacks Herptilius with his massive 'two tonne' gun, and Sam cans him. When The MBC Members are back together again, Cathy gets an antidote to her allergy, and is free of Jeremy's grip. Cathy then says, "A promise is a promise" and kisses Jeremy on the cheek.
36	38	"Sticky Situation"	March 17, 2009	138
Gluten is now allowed to be set free by the galactic authorities, and returns to Earth to try to find Rhapsodians. Meanwhile, in Mr. Fusster's class, Wendy and Cathy are paired on a project together, and Wendy doesn't bring in some of the ingredients stating, "My dress would probably get stained" so Cathy substitutes the ingredient with her saliva, which causes a chemical eruption. Wendy gets weird spots on her face later, and when The MBC Members find out Gluten has returned to earth, they think that he's after Cathy, and Cathy says she'll be bait so that they can vacuvate him and keep him under control. Cathy then finds that her powers have vanished, and Gluten calls her an 'earthling' he doesn't want. Hugo examines Cathy and tells her that Rhapsodian saliva can be toxic, and he says he'll try to find an antidote, but in the meantime, Cathy will have to be a normal earthling in the meantime. The MBC Members head back to school to look for a Rhapsodian and an antidote for Cathy. Danny and Sam find out that Wendy has Cathy's powers, and Cathy and Chris manage to find out that Cathy's powers have transferred over to whoever was standing closest to Cathy, which was Wendy. Sam and Danny try to calm her down, but she eats chocolate cake, which normally makes Cathy go hyper, and the same effect is happening to Wendy. They then try to stop Wendy before Gluten finds her, but Wendy disappears because Gluten captures her. The MBC Members split up to look for Wendy and any clues as to where she is. Danny and Cathy find Wendy's designer backpack, and get a call from Chris and Sam telling them to go to the gym. Hugo finds an antidote to Cathy's power-loss, telling her that she'll need to get close to Wendy again to get her powers back. Cathy goes to find Wendy, and Hugo says that he'll try to bring Gluten by doing the Rhapsodian funny dance. Gluten comes and jams all the doors shut, which lock Chris, Danny and Sam out, but they find vents to get in through. Meanwhile, Cathy finds Wendy and frees her, but Wendy starts to have Cathy's powers getting out of control. Meanwhile, Gluten tries to attack Hugo, but he has very strong powers, so he isn't easily hurt. Cathy manages to stop Wendy, and gets her powers back. She goes and helps Hugo defeat Gluten, who gets canned. We then see Cathy and Wendy retry their experiment with the proper chemical, and the material changes color. Cathy then pranks Wendy by using Rhapsodian Color Markers to make her think she's gone mad again.
37	39	"Galaxy's Strangest Creatures"	March 18, 2009	139
As people start suddenly -and quickly- to disappear without any trail left, The MBC Members start thinking about "Speedy" causing these losses. But "Speedy" is not the only alien who runs extremely fast, and they will discover soon enough that he is the only one who can help them!
38	27	"It's Not Good to Be King"	February 8, 2009	127
The one night The MBC Members get peace, but suddenly a loud crash draws Chris to go out to check, thinking it to only be a garden supply drop off. Back in the clubhouse, Cathy is sick and sneezing. The next morning, one trusted alien mistakes Chris for a great Emperor and the alien's enemies try to take Chris away.
39	28	"The Whole Truth"	February 15, 2009	128
In the outer space, the alien Agar escapes from the galactic authorities prison to earth. Meanwhile, in the club house, the Zubin warns them to can him no matter what it takes. Danny goes to school and works on a science project for class with Wendy. John creates a weapon that forces The MBC Members to at first react strangely to lies, and then second, say only the truth. Unfortunately, trouble is coming as Agar searches for the last to elements for his cloaking shield. Now, they must avoid lying while trying to stop a ruthless space criminal as he invades their school.
40	40	"Disappearing Act"	May 16, 2009	140
Chris, Sam, and Danny's alarms go off and they go to the clubhouse. Wedge is now a magician and Danny wants to learn some magic tricks to impress Wendy. Wedge soon makes Single Town disappear.
41	41	"Keep Your Eye on the Nebulak"	May 30, 2009	141
The MBC Members are to take well care of the planet Nebulak and Hugo has to make peace inside by making a house of cards. The catch is that the planet looks like a bowling ball and an egg to an ugly alien. In the end, The MBC Members defeat the alien, but Mark was watching so they made it all seem fake. Finally Hugo makes peace and gets a trophy, but has to give it to Mark.
42	42	"The Famous Four (Part 1 of 2)"	June 6, 2009	142
After busting a relatively weak alien, the MBC are flying back to the clubhouse when Danny is suddenly sucked into an odd pink tunnel that leads back to the mountain where they just came from. Danny sees Singletown being destroyed by invading alien forces. Rushing back to the clubhouse via the pink tunnel, he tells the MBC about his sighting, but they dismiss it after seeing Singletown safe from harm. Suddenly they discover Mark in front of the clubhouse, taunting them about the MBC. After realizing that Mark got hold of a camera that Chris used to film the first MBC training session, the members manage to convince Mark and his friends that it was all just a game, but Mark accidentally lets loose the just recently busted alien, forcing them to battle the alien in front of Mark and his friends! One of them records it on his cell phones and spreads it around school. The MBC are instant celebrities, and eventually all of them come to enjoy their newfound fame. However, the Commander is very displeased, and shuts down the MBC because of the breach in security, and orders Cathy and her grandfather to come back to Rhapsodia. Mr. Smith, however, is on a camping trip with Ms. Rollins, and the Commander must find him. Everything goes wrong when a fleet of warships arrive on Earth, intent on conquering it now that the MBC is disbanded. The alien warships capture the Commander. After Sam, Chris, Danny, and Cathy try but fail to save the Commander, they return to the clubhouse, where their backup weapons give it just enough power to use the computer. Cathy reveals that the odd pink tunnel that Danny was sucked into can actually transport people through time, and that what Danny saw was the future. Sam and Danny decide to head back in time and retrieve the camera before Mark does, so that their secret will remain safe and nothing will have ever happened. However, they arrive on the day that Danny was first sucked into the tunnel, when they were hunting the weak alien. Sam and Danny hide while their past selves hunt for the alien. Suddenly Sam makes a noise and the past-MBC walks towards their hiding place suspiciously.
43	43	"The Famous Four (Part 2 of 2)"	June 13, 2009	143
Sam and Danny were trying to connect with their past selves. But at the same time things are changing in the future. As Sam and Danny are in the past Chris and Cathy try to stop the aliens from taking over like Danny saw in first part. Meanwhile the Commander is trying to get the key from one of his 37 stomachs and get the MBC back. As soon as Sam and Danny get the video camera they hand back to when they were in the clubhouse. So now Singletown is now safe.
44	44	"Here Comes the Bride"	June 20, 2009	144
When the students get to school, surprises start happening everywhere. When Mr. Fusster gets a broom, an alien from Numbare, Mimi, tries to get Mr. Fusster to marry her. The MBC save Mr. Fusster, but Mimi is getting mad. They see Mr. Fusster buying texido shoes. Cathy invites Mr. Smith to the "fake" wedding being used to bust Mimi. When Mr. Fusster and Mimi are dancing, they notice Mr. Fusster is using alien moves. They bust Mimi but when Mr. Fusster questions the wedding the MBC thinks that Mr. Fusster might be an alien because his unuasual knowledge of Numbarians.
45	45	"Dancing in the Dark"	June 27, 2009	145
Jeremy asks Cathy to be his date to the earthclips, and thinks she said yes. At the clubhouse, the Commander gives Cathy a test she needs to pass in order to stay in the MBC. Mr.Smith, Chris, Sam, and Danny watch the earthclips, but last longer than it was said to be. They spot a spaceship and an alien who is controlling everyone's minds. They find out he was stopped by other MBC teams over the years. Cathy's mind leads her to a special magazine that is in Jeremy's room. Sam is stuck in a rocket sent to destroy the sun. Jeremy and Cathy work on a way to help Sam, spin! Chris and Danny dance to hard for the machine, and it blows up. Sam returns home and everyone wakes up from there trance.
46	46	"Clean Sweep"	July 11, 2009	146
A clean freak alien has come to Singletown to clean all the "messes", at least what he calls messes. But when he starts throwing all the supposed "trash" into a vortex and decides that he wants to get rid of humans. Meanwhile Cathy is addicted to ordering stuff from Singletown advertisements for only a penny, leaving her home filled with boxes. So Chris leads the clean freak alien to Cathy's house, where he organizes all the boxes. There, Sam evacuvates him and the town is saved once again.
47	47	"Laugh Attack"	July 18, 2009	147
It all started with Gilbert (from "Comic Book Heroes") who made trouble by bringing from his planet a laughing machine called a 'Ha Ha Honker' which hit Matisse. So now Matisse is going around town making everyone laugh. Now the MBC have to stop the laughing before it hits them, but it was too late because while being at the school, Matisse found Sam and Chris and made them both laugh. Meanwhile, Gilbert has landed on earth trying to get the Ha Ha Honker back and keep Singletown safe. Cathy is later blasted, but instead of laughing, crying. Matisse then get the 'Ha Ha Honker stuck in a satellite dish causing a cloud that spread the effects all over town. In the end it's up to Danny to save Singletown and his friends.
48	48	"Gotta Dance"	July 25, 2009	148
King Petalia is back, or should I say former King Petalia is back, and he is in Single Town to learn how to dance from the only person who ever got him to dance "Jeremy". But the problem is at first when he comes to Single Town he says that the clipper bots are after him but instead they are working for him. The MBC finds out and learn that to get Jeremy to teach him how to dance he's using a machine that sucks Jeremy's life force [while Jeremy is clueless, thinking that he's on some kind of hidden camera dance show]. The MBC later defeats him and they vacuvate him.
49	49	"The Sound of Moochie"	August 1, 2009	149
Cathy's aunt Freeda and her new husband Moochie show up unexpectedly to Single Town because Moochie has clingindwarfers disease(obsessed singing disorder) and Mr. Smiths garden is the only place that has the cure. But when Principal Rollins sees Moochie sing she asks him to sing the new school anthem in front of everyone only when Moochie sings with a microphone it gets so loud that things shake and break so the MBC tries to stop him from singing but they have no luck. Just in time Freeda shows up with the cure and gives it to Moochie and Single Town is safe once again.
50	50	"Silly Human Tricks"	October 31, 2009	150
An alien from the galaxy disguised as a woman and impossible to be found by the alien scanner because of her cloak, is trying as a pet trainer not to help the children at the school on training their pets but to get their owners to be her pets on the galaxy's pet competition for a chance to win the first prize. Note: This episode is called "Stupid Human Tricks" on Disney XD in the U.S.
51	51	"Princess Sam"	November 7, 2009	151
Doudo, the worshiping alien from "It's No Good to be King", who revered Chris as a king, returns to Singletown and asks Sam to make believe she's a princess, in order to protect a real alien princess hunted by some distant alien warrior looking like a huge pig. Sam hesitates, but accepts. From then on, she has to act exactly like an authentic princess does: she must learn to walk, to talk, to position herself, to smile just like a member of the royal family would. Notably, she's not allowed by Doudo to do anything, including help her friends to hunt down aliens. And all the good deeds Sam had to complete in her schedule – do the shopping for an old lady, help clean the park and so on – are transferred to Chris, Cathy and Danny. Meanwhile, the alien keep on looking for the alien princess, and devouring everything he can, because of his tremendous appetite. When Doudo realizes that the pig-warrior is getting closer, he does all he can to stop him. As Sam decides she can't bear the make-believe any longer, and that she will go help her friends to bust the pig-warrior, ignoring Doudo's warnings, this one traps Sam in a ball and goes to fight his enemy. Once Sam finally gets out of the ball, she joins the rest of the team for the hunt. But the pig-warrior finds her and understands she's no princess. He then manages to locate the real princess, captures her and tries to escape, but the MBC can trap him on the skate ramp in the park and vacuvate him. In the end, Sam confesses she'll never "play the princess" again, as she's really not made for that.
52	52	"Goodbye Earth"	November 14, 2009	152
The MBC is infected by an alien virus. In order to quarantine them, the clubhouse was sent to outer space. This episode is made up mostly of flashbacks on the MBC's adventures showing how they got infected in the first place, but also focusing on the personalities of the team, and also notably insisting on the importance of team work to solve problems (many sequences show how MBC could capture aliens on uniting their strengths). Mr. Smith then uses his Rhapsodian healing powers to cure Danny, Chris and Sam, but fails in curing Cathy. It appears that the virus can't be extracted from Cathy's human body : so she has to transform back into her Rhapsodian form and concentrate hard to expel the virus. Once it's out of her, Cathy turns back into human & the team blasts the virus, which automatically ends quarantine. The clubhouse can now safely return to Earth. Note: This is the series finale.
