= The Devil Within (2010 film) =

- Film poster
- Directed by: Tom Hardy
- Written by: Matt Dean
- Produced by: Cindy Aldridge; Randy Aldridge; Matt Dean; Tom Milo
- Starring: Elizabeth Di Prinzio; Ryn Harrison; Bill Oberst Jr.; Grey Damon
- Cinematography: Terence Pratt
- Edited by: Matt Dean
- Music by: Craig Eastman
- Production companies: Dean Production Group; Lunar Motion Pictures
- Distributed by: Seminal Films
- Release date: May 21, 2010
- Running time: 80 minutes
- Country: United States
- Language: English

The Devil Within (also known as The Devil Within: Rise of Evil) is a 2010 independent feature film directed by Tom Hardy and written by Matt Dean. The film follows 18 year-old Sirena's high school birthday pool party, which soon turns bloody as an unexpected guest begins murdering the teens one at a time. It received decent reviews from fans and the horror community.
