= List of Ultimate Muscle episodes =

This is a list of Ultimate Muscle episodes.

== Episodes ==
=== Season 1 (2002–03) ===
==== DMP arc (2002) ====
No.	Title	Original release date	English air date	Prod. code
1	"A Legend Reborn"; Transliteration: "New Chojin Legend! Mantaro Appears" (Japanese: 新超人伝説！万太郎登場)	January 9, 2002	September 14, 2002	101
Years have passed since King Muscle and the Muscle League Champions vanquished the evil dMp wrestlers. Lacking strength to stand up for itself, the Earth must turn to the Kinniku family. All hope for salvation is in Kid Muscle. Kid Muscle reaches the Earth and makes a less-than-welcome acquaintance: Adversarius, who has come to extinguish him before he can follow in his father's footsteps.
2	"Generation-Next"; Transliteration: "Battle to the Dead! Golden Death Match" (Japanese: 死闘！金剛デスマッチ！)	January 16, 2002	September 14, 2002	102
Kid Muscle is taken to the Hercules Factory—an academy where future heroes are trained. Kid Muscle's true test comes when Boaconda invades the school and locks both Kid Muscle and himself inside the Titanium Ring, from which neither wrestler will be released until one is pronounced the winner.
3	"Making the Cut (Part 1 of 2)"; Transliteration: "Fierce Battle! Hercules Factory!" (Japanese: 激戦！ヘラクレスファクトリー！)	January 23, 2002	September 21, 2002	103
The new generation of wrestlers must face the Muscle Leaguers they aspire to replace. Terry Kenyon and Samuu face two opponents: Ramenman and Buffaloman. In the bouts that follow, Kid Muscle must face a legendary chojin as well, but this chojin is even more powerful than the legends faced before...King Muscle.
4	"Like Father Like Son (Part 2 of 2)"; Transliteration: "Battle of the Century! 1st vs. 2nd" (Japanese: 対決！I世対II世)	January 30, 2002	September 21, 2002	104
As Kid Muscle faces off against King Muscle, memories of his father's weakest moments render Kid Muscle incapable of wrestling. He sees Muscle League wrestlers supporting him from the sidelines, and realizes the responsibility of being a Kinnikuman.
5	"Mask of Terror (Part 1 of 3)"; Transliteration: "Evil Chojin? Kevin Mask" (Japanese: 悪行超人？ケビンマスク)	February 6, 2002	September 28, 2002	105
The new generation of Muscle League wrestlers thought the Hercules Factory was tough. But the factory was nothing compared to what they will face when they square off with their first matches with the Ultimate KKK league of fighters.
6	"Dial Up Danger (Part 2 of 3)"; Transliteration: "Voice of Fear! Tel-Tel Boy" (Japanese: 恐怖の声！テルテルボーイ)	February 13, 2002	September 28, 2002	106
Trouble has got Kid Muscle's Line when he faces his first dMp challenger, Dialbolic. Roxanne might ring Kid Muscle's bells, but will she be enough to inspire our reluctant hero to victory?
7	"Call Waiting (Part 3 of 3)"; Transliteration: "Defeated! Trauma Voice!" (Japanese: 打倒！トラウマボイス！)	February 20, 2002	October 5, 2002	107
After using his "Trouma Voice Dial", Dialbolic finally makes an error. But Kid Muscle's victory proves fleeting when Dialbolic unleashes a volley of electrical attacks to Kid Muscle.
8	"Trouble Afoot (Part 1 of 2)"; Transliteration: "Ultimate Transformation! MAXman" (Japanese: 究極変身！MAXマン)	February 27, 2002	October 5, 2002	108
Max Man (Pumpinator) is in the ring, ready to finish off Mantaro, when Kevin Mask interrupts and belittle him for being a coward and self centered, and tells him he will get more respect if he fights Mantaro when he is at full strength, rather than taking advantage of his weakened condition. Max Man agrees to a one-hour rest for Mantaro. In the meantime Mantaro is laid out on 3 front row seats resting under a blanket, next to the beef guidon. Pumpinator then challenges Wally to a fight. Wally overwhelms Pumpinator with a series of moves, just when Wally is about to kick him Max Man tells him to hold on while he regains his strength Wally agrees and gets kneed in the stomach and gets beating badly. Wally stands up barley have any strength left tells Mad Max to show him his best move which he accepts and defeats Wally with his pump thumper move, Wally is taking to the hospital, meanwhile Kid Muscle having watch his friend get beaten decides he will fight Pumpinator and avenge Wally.
9	"Fury of the Scorned Shoe (Part 2 of 2)"; Transliteration: "Showdown! Mantaro vs MAXman" (Japanese: 決戦！万太郎対MAXマン)	March 6, 2002	October 12, 2002	109
It seems years ago, Shacodile has suffered a defeat from King Muscle. Because of this, Pumpinator, his grandson wants to defeat Kid Muscle, in sought of victory. As Kid Muscle is losing the match he decides he wants to quit but after tripping on Wally's bandager the Kid decides enough is enough! During the match Kid Muscle discovers Pumpinator's weakness which is called a stinkbug the Kid slams Max Man on it twice and defeats Max Man with his Kinniku Buster avenging Wally.
10	"Unmellow Yellow"; Transliteration: "Sunshine's Trap!" (Japanese: サンシャインの罠！)	March 13, 2002	October 12, 2002	110
The Muscle League embark on a trip to "Little Tokyo" to challenge the "Sunshine Nightmare". While waiting Kid Muscle goes to the sushi bar and meets Sunshine himself!
11	"The Hand That Bites You (Part 1 of 2)"; Transliteration: "The Evil Jurassic Hand" (Japanese: 魔のジュラシックハンド)	March 20, 2002	October 19, 2002	111
Terry the Kid competes in a steel cage match against Tyranoclaw with Kid Muscle as the special guest referee. Tyranoclaw is a dinosaur with his head in his Jurassic hand but what appeared to be his head only held his brain. The match starts off with neither one getting a serious advantage.
12	"Cold War (Part 2 of 2)"; Transliteration: "Will the Tables Be Turned?! Kid's Self-Sacrificing Attack!" (Japanese: 逆転なるか？！キッド捨て身の攻撃！)	March 27, 2002	October 19, 2002	112
Terry has been injured by Tyranoclaw and still continues the fight. After a while Tyranoclaw's Jurassic hand is put into a strangle hold by Terry and starts fossilizing. Tyranoclaw starts using his brutal attacks on Terry the Kid but he is helped out by Kid Muscle who tells chillingly bad jokes (Cold was supposed to be a dinosaur's weakness as, according to Terry the Kid, dinosaurs died out because of extremely cold conditions) which result in Tyranoclaw's Jurassic hand being frozen and bashed to bits by Terry's Calf Branding technique, which wins him the match.
13	"Checkmate! (Part 1 of 4)"; Transliteration: "The Coldblooded Knight Checkmate!" (Japanese: 冷血の騎士 チェックメイト！)	April 3, 2002	October 26, 2002	113
Evil Super Villain Sunshine's second Night Mare, Checkmate dazzles the arena but leaves Kid Muscle in a daze because this DMP villain doesn't feel pain.
14	"Feeling No Pain (Part 2 of 4)"; Transliteration: "Great Crisis! Mantaro vs. The Devil's Knight" (Japanese: 大ピンチ！万太郎VS悪魔の騎士)	April 10, 2002	October 26, 2002	114
Checkmate is a triple threat against Kid Muscle, transforming from ruthless King, to beastly Knight to cold-hearted Castle.
15	"The Student Rebellion (Part 3 of 4)"; Transliteration: "Master vs. Student?! Sunshine's Tears" (Japanese: 師弟激突？！サンシャインの涙)	April 17, 2002	November 2, 2002	115
Kid Muscle and the Muscle League are horrified when Checkmate turns against Sunshine, in a showdown between master and apprentice.
16	"The Final Move (Part 4 of 4)"; Transliteration: "Mantaro's Burning Inner Strength" (Japanese: 万太郎 火事場のクソ力)	April 24, 2002	November 2, 2002	116
As Checkmate and Kid Muscle face each other within the ring, Checkmate's right knee suddenly swells up. Kid Muscle uses ultimate muscle but despite using ultimate muscle the Kid is still being pushed back by Checkmate. Kid Muscle attacks Checkmate only for Checkmate to block it by becoming a mixture of his chess pieces and then body slams Kid Muscle. Checkmate then throws Kid Muscle into the air to pull of his ultimate move but with the crowd cheering for the Kid he wakes up and headbutts Checkmate's swelling knee and defeats him with a Kinniku Buster. Checkmate gets up only to fall into pieces.
17	"Roxanne Rocks!"; Transliteration: "Protect Rinko! The Rigany Attacks" (Japanese: 凛子を守れ！強襲THE・リガニー)	May 1, 2002	November 9, 2002	117
Roxanne is captured by the remaining members of the DMP in order to get Kid Muscle to battle them. But they got more than they bargained for when Kid Muscle will do anything to get Roxanne back!
18	"Cutting the Slack"; Transliteration: "Challenge of Generation Ex (Excellent)" (Japanese: ジェネレーションEx（エクセレント）の挑戦)	May 8, 2002	November 9, 2002	118
After defeating the DMP and restoring peace once again, Kid Muscle heads back to town and again sets about flirting with local girls.

==== Generation X arc (2002–03) ====
No.	Title	Original release date	English air date	Prod. code
19	"The Muscle League vs. The Muscle League (Part 1 of 2)"; Transliteration: "Forbidden Technique! Jade vs Gazelleman" (Japanese: 禁断の技！ジェイド対ガゼルマン)	May 15, 2002	November 16, 2002	119
The tag match between the first semester and second semester Hercules Factory students is to be held in two separate arenas.
20	"Water Damage (Part 2 of 2)"; Transliteration: "Clioneman's Fearsome Lens Attack!" (Japanese: クリオネマン 恐怖のレンズ攻撃！)	May 22, 2002	November 16, 2002	120
Knowing Dik Dik Van Dik's defeat, Wally Tusket who now is filled with fighting spirit starts fierce attack on Hydrazoa.
21	"A Bad Sign (Part 1 of 2)"; Transliteration: "Dead Signal's Nightmare Sign Attack!" (Japanese: デッド・シグナル 悪夢の標識攻撃！)	May 29, 2002	November 23, 2002	121
Wally Tusket who is again taken into Hydrazoa's body and is squeezed by Big Bone Crash* finally stops moving.
22	"Road Rage (Part 2 of 2)"; Transliteration: "Defeat the Traffic Sign!" (Japanese: トラフィックサインを打ち破れ！)	June 5, 2002	November 23, 2002	122
Rage's Traffic Sign attack pushes Kid Muscle into a crisis.
23	"From Bad to Worse"; Transliteration: "Kid in Danger! Scarface the Tyrant" (Japanese: キッド危うし！暴君スカーフェイス)	June 12, 2002	November 30, 2002	123
Continuing from the previous episode (where Kid Muscle defeated Road Rage) the Kid rushes over to the other stadium only to find Eskara wrapping Terry in the ring ropes. Terry gets out of the ropes and hits Eskara with an elbow then things go Terry's way afterwards Eskara's leg is broken by Terry's Texas tornado catch but Eskara is not in pain and reveals his true form. Terry does his best to hang on but Eskara reverses every move and improves on them but in the end Terry is defeated Eskara's ultimate scar buster. Now its up to Kid Muscle to win the tournament, can he do it?
24	"Ultimate Courage"; Transliteration: "Their Bond! Brocken Lehrer and Jade" (Japanese: 二人の絆！ブロッケン師匠（レーラァ）とジェイド)	June 19, 2002	November 30, 2002	124
Kid muscle has the perfect chance to escape from his match but sees that his friends who fought to protect him now were the ones who needed that protection.
25	"Ink or Swim (Part 1 of 2)"; Transliteration: "The Fearsome Sea Deathmatch!" (Japanese: 恐怖の海上デスマッチ！)	June 26, 2002	December 14, 2002	125
Kid Muscle takes on Hydrazoa for a chance at the finals but will Kid be able to pull off a miracle to defeat this high powered, fishy threat? NOTE: This episode was heavily edited as it had the scene where Roxanne, Kiki and Trixie all provocatively remove their clothes thus revealing their skimpy bathing suits cut from it.
26	"The Kid vs. the Squid (Part 2 of 2)"; Transliteration: "Mantaro's Revived Power of Friendship!" (Japanese: 万太郎 復活の友情パワー！)	July 3, 2002	December 14, 2002	126
Kid Muscle and Hydrazoa continue their match at first they seem equal but the fight seems to go Hydrazoa's way, just when the Kid is about to lose his friends cheer him on and with this new strength Kid Muscle gets out of Hydrazoa's body and defeats him earning him a spot at the finals!
27	"Fight for the Finals (Part 1 of 2)"; Transliteration: "Clash! Jade vs Scarface" (Japanese: 激突！ジェイドVSスカーフェイス)	July 10, 2002	February 8, 2003	127
Jaguer and Eskara face off for a chance to battle Kid Muscle in the Finals. When Eskara adds concrete to the Ring to upset Jaguers teacher will Jaguer be able to defeat his classmate on his own?
28	"A Generation Xed (Part 2 of 2)"; Transliteration: "Scarface's True Form Revealed!" (Japanese: 暴かれたスカーフェイスの正体！)	July 17, 2002	February 15, 2003	128
Eskara takes home the win with overwhelming power but is there a special reason he is fighting in this tournament?
29	"Eskara vs. Kid Muscle (Part 1 of 4)"; Transliteration: "The Battle Begins! Mantaro vs Scarface" (Japanese: 決戦開始！万太郎VSスカーフェイス)	July 24, 2002	February 22, 2003	129
After a misunderstanding Kid Muscle thinks that Roxanne is in love with him. He decides to win the match against Eskara for her and then ask her to marry him, He even TRAINS for the match!
30	"Kinniku-busted (Part 2 of 4)"; Transliteration: "The Defeated Technique! The Last Day of the Kinniku Buster" (Japanese: 破られた技！キン肉バスターの終わる日)	July 31, 2002	March 1, 2003	130
After being beaten up by Eskara the Kid formulates a plan to put the powerful foe in his trademark Kinnikubuster but when he does Eskara is able to slip out of it both times and take away the Kids' consciousness and when Kevin Mask steps forward Eskaras' identity is revealed to be Mars. He is the last of the dMp and after winning this tournament has decided to restart this evil wrestling organization! But with the mind of Jaguar and the body of Kid Muscle he'll have to work for it!
31	"A Desperate Situation (Part 3 of 4)"; Transliteration: "Desperate Crisis! Scarface's Wave Attack" (Japanese: 絶体絶命！スカーフェイス波状攻撃)	August 7, 2002	March 8, 2003	131
Kept alive by the spirit of Jaguer the Kid keeps fighting. But with the skull that connected him to Jaguer gone and the Kinniku-buster beaten the only way for the Kid to win is to create his own move! But can the Kid be that creative?
32	"The Champion of Planet Earth (Part 4 of 4)"; Transliteration: "Birth of a New Finishing Move! Muscle Millennium!" (Japanese: 新必殺技誕生！マッスルミレニアム！)	August 14, 2002	March 15, 2003	132
After being manhandled by Mars the Kid, in order to make new moves to win, must use something he has never before... HIS BRAIN! The kid begins bombarding Mars with all sorts of unique moves before bulling off his biggest yet! The Kid's NEW signature move THE MUSCLE MILLENIUM giving The Kid the match, championship and right to guard the earth from further evil!

==== The Gruesome Threesome arc (2003) ====
No.	Title	Original release date	English air date	Prod. code
33	"The Ultimate Challenge (Part 1 of 2)"; Transliteration: "Three-game Match! The Burning Inner Strength Challenge" (Japanese: 三本勝負！火事場のクソ力チャレンジ)	August 21, 2002	March 22, 2003	133
After defeating Eskara The Kid is summoned back to Muscle Planet to test his Ultimate Muscle power! He is weak and is bruised from his battles and so is given the chance to fight the Gruesome Threesome (a group of wrestlers who got their name from what their victims looked like) to find alternative ways to win other than getting beaten up. If Kid defeats the Gruesome Threesome, Kid would have to learn the true power of his Ultimate Muscle power. His father and the council believe this will toughen him up and give Kid a reputation that will make every villain fear Kid. But his Muscular foes won't be easy to overcome. If Kid loses the Gruesome Threesome will receive a full pardon.
34	"Checkmate Returns (Part 2 of 2)"; Transliteration: "Defeat Fork the Giant!" (Japanese: 打倒 フォーク・ザ・ジャイアント！)	August 28, 2002	March 29, 2003	134
The Kid is getting clobbered by the half-man, half-machine, Forkollossus! With Forkollossus playing with The Kids conscience, The Kid doesn't understand if he's right about ruining evil wrestlers life even if it is saving the world! And when the baddest of the dMp returns, Checkmate, it can only spell trouble for the Kid or maybe not!
35	"Hanzo vs. Ninja Ned (Part 1 of 3)"; Transliteration: "Spirit of a Justice Chojin! Hanzo vs Ninja" (Japanese: 正義超人魂！ハンゾウVSザ・ニンジャ)	September 4, 2002	April 5, 2003	135
After defeating Forkollossus the Kid is transported to his next enemy of the gruesome threesome, Hanzo the Horrible! Hearing this Hanzo's capture Ninja Ned tries to talk them out of giving him his freedom because of the horrible things he has done, taken the face of hundreds, when he is ignored Ninja Ned goes to battle Hanzo instead of the Kid! But when this legend is defeated will the Kid be able to beat Hanzo and avenge Ninja Ned?
36	"The Ninja Alliance (Part 2 of 3)"; Transliteration: "Can't Use Signature Techniques?! The Tatami Ring Death Match" (Japanese: 必殺技が使えない？！畳リングデスマッチ)	September 11, 2002	April 12, 2003	136
As Ninja Ned falls down the bottomless pit his scarf flies up to The Kid, meaning only one thing Ninja Ned has selected The Kid to avenge him. So then The Kid knows what he must do...RUN! But when The Ninja's spirit comes to help him The Kid gets enough courage to go face Hanzo! Now with the strength and knowledge of The Ninja and a new grass mat, will The Kid be able to defeat the faceless Samurai?
37	"Tatami or Not, Here I Come (Part 3 of 3)"; Transliteration: "The Fearsome Fairy Arm Blade! Mantaro's Mask in Danger!" (Japanese: 恐怖の妖腕刀！危うし万太郎マスク！)	September 18, 2002	April 19, 2003	137
The Kid continues to battle for his life without his finisher attack to save him. And now Hanzo shows that the grass mat can't stop his Tatami puppet. Soon the Kid is beaten off the mat. He soon meets Ninja Ned in the spirit world who tells him with the loss of the old Kid a new stronger Ultimate Muscle is now inside him. With that the Kid wakes up and finds he has been saved by the Ninja's scarf. Now with the new Ultimate Muscle can the Kid stop the powerful Samurai?
38	"Bone Cold Day in Paradise (Part 1 of 3)"; Transliteration: "The Terrible Hitman! Enter Bone Cold" (Japanese: 恐怖の暗殺者（ヒットマン）！ボーン・コールド登場)	September 25, 2002	April 26, 2003	138
With Hanzo defeated the Kid goes to face his new even greater foe "Bone Cold"! But when the fight takes place in such a warm beach what could go wrong...well Mitch could get kidnapped. Now the Kid must find the 3rd flame of the torch and complete his Ultimate Muscle training.
39	"For Meat's Sake (Part 2 of 3)"; Transliteration: "The Worst Technique! Shooting Arrow!" (Japanese: 最悪の攻撃！シューテングアロー！)	October 2, 2002	May 3, 2003	139
Kid Muscle meets the third and final competitor in his Ultimate Muscle challenge, Bone Cold. Definitely the strongest and worst of the three Bone Cold only has one weakness, a secret Mitch knows then again Mitch also knows a secret about Meats but before he tells either secret Bone Cold shoots him Mitch and... breaks his hip! But with his last breath before he is transported to a bed he tells Meats he is his father. Now can The Kid beat Bone Cold and avenge Mitch or will Bone Cold win and be set free from jail?
40	"The Ultimate Victor (Part 3 of 3)"; Transliteration: "Settled! The Burning Inner Strength Challenge" (Japanese: 決着！火事場のクソ力チャレンジ)	October 9, 2002	May 10, 2003	140
After a long battle with Bone Cold, Kid Muscle finally pulls together and calls upon the power of Ultimate Muscle. With one final Muscle Millennium move, he takes out Bone Cold and claims his third victory of the Ultimate Muscle Challenge. However, when he can't light the torch, he sees Bone Cold and his father Skullduggery make up their ways and become family again. Terry and Checkmate have also become friends, despite their differences, and now, having learned this, Kid lights the third flame and claims the true power of Ultimate Muscle!

==== Poison Six-Pac arc (2003) ====
No.	Title	Original release date	English air date	Prod. code
41	"The Chojin Crown"; Transliteration: "The Battle Begins! Chojin World Grand Prix" (Japanese: 激闘開幕！超人ワールドグランプリ)	October 16, 2002	May 17, 2003	141
When the Chojin Crown tournament becomes a tournament once more, all Muscle League Fighters must return to their home countries to fight for a position in the tournament. All fighters return- except Kid Muscle. When Kid overhears Roxanne and her mother talking about how they love guys with bulging muscles fighting in a tournament for honor and the cheers of millions of fans, he runs off to join the Tournament for the Chojin Crown.
42	"The Prince and the Pauper"; Transliteration: "Japan's Representative Decided! Mantaro vs Nosonman" (Japanese: 日本代表決定！万太郎VS農村マン)	October 23, 2002	May 31, 2003	142
There is only one spot in left in the Chojin Crown tournament and The Kid has his eye on it (to get Roxanne's eyes on him), but first he will have to get past El Nino "The Wrestler of the People"! Will The Kid be able to overcome El Nino's hurricane-like attacks and go on to the Chojin Crown or will El Nino finally fulfill his mothers final wishes and get his face on a tee-shirt? Kid was able to defeat El Nino and earn his spot on the tournament while El Nino finally got a chance to start his career since his match against the kid created publicity.
43	"Rock, Paper, Chojin"; Transliteration: "Break Through the Preliminaries! Beach Flags Yay!" (Japanese: 予選突破！ビーチフラッグスでイエイ！)	October 30, 2002	June 7, 2003	143
The Kid, now with a spot in the Chojin Crown, must compete in several tests until one Chojin will prevail. The first grueling task is a best out of 3 rock, paper, scissors and made you look competition, this Dik Dik Van Dik lost (he's a naturally curious creature). Followed by a heat where 3 wrestlers race to the finish line to save a falling person, this Wally lost. Will the Kid be able to survive and advance?
44	"Three Feet Heat"; Transliteration: "Perfect Match! Three-Legged Race Zei-Zei!" (Japanese: 相性ばっちり！二人三脚でゼイゼイ！)	November 6, 2002	June 21, 2003	144
After Terry "The Grand" Kenyon Loses To Jeager In The Catch The Falling Person Game, The Next Challenge To Qualify For The Finals Is The Three-Legged Obstacle Race Where A Chojin A Paired Up With A Non-Chojin And Have To Finish In The Top 12. Kid Muscle Gets Stuck With A Sumo wrestler named Sasaki. Can Kid Muscle Get To The Top 12 In Order To Qualify For The Finals.
45	"The Poison Six-Pack (Part 1 of 2)"; Transliteration: "Chojin World Grand Prix Cancelled! Six Mantaros?" (Japanese: 超人WGP（ワールドグランプリ）中断！6人の万太郎？)	November 13, 2002	June 28, 2003	145
A Group Of Evil Wrestlers Called The Poison Six-Pack, Who Are Disguised As Evil Kid Muscle Clones, Crash The Ikemen Chojin Crown Banquet, Attacked Ikemen McMadd, And Kidnapped Roxanne, Trixie, And Kiki And Then Escape In Their Flying Transport That Looks Like A Jester's Head. To Get Them Back, Kid Muscle, Jeager, Kevin Mask, Terry "The Grand" Kenyon, Dik Dik Van Dik, Wally Tusket, And Checkmate Must Battle The Six-Pack, In Their True Forms, In A Tag-Team Match Located In The Redwood Forest To Free The Girls Who Are Dressed Up In Jungle Outfits.
46	"Tag! You're It! (Part 2 of 2)"; Transliteration: "Tag Battle! Death Match in the Woodland Ring!" (Japanese: タッグ対決！樹海リングの死闘！)	November 20, 2002	September 6, 2003	46
The Tag-Team Match Between Terry Kenyon And Jeager VS Dazz-Ling And The Protector Of The Poison Six-Pack Continue. Kid Muscle Uses The Stink Bug On A Fishing Pole To Snap Terry Kenyon Out Of Dazz-Ling's Illusion And Terry Saves Jeager From The Protector And They Agree To Work As A Team. Terry Kenyon Deflects Dazz-Ling's Illusion Beam At The Protector Trapping Him In An Illusion. Jeager uses his red reign of pain of The Protector then knocks him out with a kick defeating him. Dazz-Ling's in Terry's submission move and starts digging the ring to get out of it not only escaping the move but sending himself, Terry and Jeager down a cavern, Dazz-Ling attempts to break a branch that Terry was holding onto, it breaks sending Terry further down but is saved by Jeager. He swings Terry at Dazz-Ling grabbing him by the horns and knocks him out with the Calf Branding move therefore winning the first grudge match and saving Trixie's life.
47	"Cheek to Cheek (Part 1 of 2)"; Transliteration: "Hilarious! Puri-Puri Man's Trap!" (Japanese: 笑激！プリプリマンの罠！)	November 27, 2002	September 13, 2003	147
Wally and Dik Dik vs. Mr French (A frog) and Moisseur Cheeks (A butt). They fight to rescue Kiki who is in the jester head and the odds aren't good.
48	"On Poison Pond (Part 2 of 2)"; Transliteration: "Crisis! The Frog Ring Battle!" (Japanese: 絶対絶命！カエルリングの闘い！)	December 4, 2002	September 20, 2003	148
After Monsieur Cheeks Knocks Wally Tusket into The lake and Mr. French dropping Ooze into it, Wally's Mom Reminds Him Of The Time She Taught Him How To Move Through The Cold Water. Wally Remembers And Uses His Strength To Move Through The Lake And Returns To The Ring. Mr. French Uses His Tongue-Whip Attacks On Him, Even If It Involves Knocking Wally's Mom And His Sister Dorothy Into The Lake. Dik Dik Van Dik Wants To Tag In, But Mr. French Tells Him That If Wally Leaves, He And Monsieur Cheeks Will Beat Up Dik Dik. Everyone else tries to help but nothing seems to work everyone agrees The Kid should go which he does (Meat kicked him into the lake). Kid Muscle is almost successful but had to return to the surface due to him nearly drowning after being kicked into the corner by Mr. French Dik Dik tells Wally to tag out to save his family. Dik Dik is holding his own against Mr. French when Monsieur Cheeks joins in and overwhelms Dik Dik. He is thrown to the ropes and Monsieur Cheeks tries to kill him but is stopped by Checkmate. Checkmate knocks out both of them and returns to the others. Dik Dik filled with fighting sprit punches Monsieur Cheeks and smacks him, Mr. French goes to attack him but is stopped by Wally who returns after saving his family and defeats Mr. French with a sky high driver and Dik Dik takes out Monsieur Cheeks with savannah heat, Wally and Dik Dik get their first win!! Now with Kiki saved and the second match over now its up to Kid Muscle and Kevin Mask to win the last match. Can they pull it off?
49	"The Final Grudge Match (Part 1 of 3)"; Transliteration: "Kevin Arrives! Battle of the Crater Ring!" (Japanese: ケビン登場！火口リングの激突！)	December 11, 2002	September 27, 2003	149
The final match of the Poison Six Pack between Kid Muscle and Kevin Mask vs. Jagg-Ed and Baron Maximillion to decide the fate of Roxanne is about to begin. Kevin Mask decides to go first, facing off against Jagg-Ed. The two begin their battle, and Kevin Mask soon takes charge of things, smacking Jagg-Ed around with his fists and doing all sorts of moves. Jagg-Ed finally musters a saw-blade attack by detaching both of his arms and hurling them like spinning blades at Kevin Mask, but Kevin is too quick and dodges them. Although Kevin is victorious he is disqualified due to him and Jagg-Ed being out of the ring for more than 20 seconds.
50	"Kid Muscle Max'd Out (Part 2 of 3)"; Transliteration: "Baron Maximilian's Stormy Assault!" (Japanese: バロン・マクシミリアン嵐の猛攻撃！)	December 18, 2002	October 4, 2003	150
With Baron Maximillion and Kid Muscle ready to square off, Kid Muscle laughs at the boniness of the Baron's body, as he is the skinniest wrestler anyone has ever seen. The Baron says that strength isn't the only way to win a battle, and Kid Muscle soon learns this as he charges toward the Baron and misses every time. Maximillion is too fast for him, and zips around the ring, striking Kid Muscle repeatedly.
51	"Sleep Fighter (Part 3 of 3)"; Transliteration: "The Last Battle! Kinniku Mantaro Forever" (Japanese: 最終決戦（ラストバトル）！キン肉万太郎よ永遠に)	December 25, 2002	October 11, 2003	151
At the end of the last episode, Kid Muscle was down after suffering Baron Maximillion's devastating finisher—the Baron Wasteland. The episode begins with Kid still unconscious and his friends doubting his victory, when suddenly, much to the chagrin of the Baron, Kid comes to his feet. As excited as everyone is that Kid Muscle is standing again, Meat informs everyone that Kid Muscle may be standing—but he is sound asleep on his feet as a result of all the punishment that Maxamillion has inflicted! Kid Muscle does wake up only to be hit in the stomach by the Baron but with support of his friends, the crowd and even the wrestlers he's defeated are cheering him on and with this strength Kid Muscle defeats Baron Maximillion with that he saves Roxanne and eats cow and rice to celebrate.

=== Season 2 (2003–04) ===
==== Chojin Crown arc (2003–04) ====
No.	Title	Original release date	English air date	Prod. code
52	"The Chojin Crown Resumes"; Transliteration: "Resumed! Chojin World Grand Prix" (Japanese: 再開! 超人ワールドグランプリ)	April 7, 2004	October 18, 2003	201
This episode starts off with the Muscle League training at Kid Muscle's place and wondering when the Chojin Crown will begin again. All except Kid Muscle who is, of course, still asleep. They are interrupted however, by Kevin Mask. Kevin insults the Muscle League and Jeager takes offense. The two then collide in the ring—until Kid Muscle shows up and breaks up the fight. Soon after, a helicopter carrying a beautiful red-haired woman appears and she asks the Kid for directions to the arena. Kid of course, being both lovestruck and incredibly stupid, gives her the wrong directions.
53	"Finally the Finals! (Part 1 of 3)"; Transliteration: "Violent Fight! Mantaro Steps Forward" (Japanese: 激烈ファイト! 万太郎出陣)	April 15, 2004	October 25, 2003	202
In black arena is Photo-Pat VS D-Struction, in the red arena is Ricardo the bomber [from Brazil] VS Slyscraper [with Terry Kenyon coaching him]. Slyscraper uses the Body Scraper on Ricardo. The next time he uses that move, Ricardo dodges and tells Terry that he would've won the "Falling Girl Rescue" if he didn't save that kid from drowning. Ricardo starts to make a comeback as he traps Slyscraper in a full nelson and dives head-first upside-down causing the shockwave to severely damage Slyscraper which wins him the match.
54	"Kid Goes Hollywood (Part 2 of 3)"; Transliteration: "Wash Ass' Demonic Toilet Flush" (Japanese: ウォッシュアス 魔境のトイレ流し)	April 22, 2004	November 1, 2003	203
As wrestlers get ready for the second fight of the first round the kid is getting ready to battle his biggest foe ever, Hollywood Bowl, a Hollywood directing-toilet! With his ability to lure his opponents into advantageous positions (with his bowls smell) he is determined to get revenge on the kid after King muscle defeated his father many years ago. Will the kid be able to get over his weakness in overly enjoying bodily functions and defeat this toilet menace?
55	"The Final Flush (Part 3 of 3)"; Transliteration: "Mantaro's Counterattack! Sure-killing Galbi bowl Marching Song?!" (Japanese: 万太郎反撃! 必殺カルビ丼音頭?!)	April 29, 2004	November 8, 2003	204
After being beaten up pretty badly by Hollywood it looks as though this super toilet will get his revenge until Kid's sumo racing buddy, Satoshi, comes giving kid a snack of cow and rice. The kid uses his bowl to plug up Hollywoods bowl and it's a whole new match. Will the Kid be able to beat a toilet and advance to the next round of the Chojin?
56	"The Inner Light"; Transliteration: "Great Crisis! Kevin Mask vs Chijimiman" (Japanese: 大ピンチ! ケビンマスクVSチヂミマン)	May 6, 2004	November 15, 2003	205
In the black division it is Kevin Masks turn to fight against Chichini man, the Korean dragon, but Kevin doesn't show! When Kevin's coach goes to find him. He finds that after intense training Kevin Mask had fainted in the sauna! Now Kevin Mask is being mutilated by the Korean dragon and it appears that his Chojin championship is coming to an end, when a light (a lot like ultimate muscle) emanates from his body! Will this light lead to Kevin masks victory over this powerful foe?
57	"Double Trouble (Part 1 of 3)"; Transliteration: "Barrierfreeman's Stormy Old Man Attacks" (Japanese: バリアフリーマン 嵐の老人殺法)	May 13, 2004	November 22, 2003	206
After defeating Hollywood bowl, the kid moves on to his mysterious second round opponent, Barrier Freeman, half man/half older man, who is wrestling to help society become more seniorfriendly (a sort of senior avenger). He has bought half the seats and given them to seniors to see him destroy kid muscle. With the crowd against the kid, barrier freeman manhandles the kid. Will the kid be able to turn this match around before he's knocked out of the tournament and is there something less nice about this senior?
58	"Biting the Hand That Needs Him (Part 2 of 3)"; Transliteration: "Old Man Power Explodes! Mantaro in Danger!" (Japanese: 老人パワー炸裂! 万太郎絶体絶命!)	May 20, 2004	November 29, 2003	207
Kid Muscle is rendered helpless as the old man form of Barrier-Free Man is slapping him silly. The senior citizens cheer on, and the Kid realizes that all of his body but his waist are numb, so he uses his waste to knock Barrier-Free Man into the air and then kick him out of the ring. Barrier-Free Man is helped into the ring by Roxanne and friends, which makes Kid Muscle angry as he faces the old man again.
59	"Tackle That Twosome! (Part 3 of 3)"; Transliteration: "Settled! Mantaro vs Barrierfreeman" (Japanese: 決着! 万太郎VSバリアフリーマン)	May 27, 2004	December 6, 2003	208
As the old man gains control of Barrier-Free Man again, the crowd is beginning to favor Kid Muscle instead after it is revealed that the old man really doesn't care about the senior citizens, but rather about having fame among young women. Terry Kenyon does some websurfing (using Doc as a plugin) and looks up the old man half of Barrier-Free Man, revealing him as an old-time wrestler named Chijo Man.
60	"The Stealth Chojin"; Transliteration: "The Red Assassin! Ilioukhine Arrives" (Japanese: 赤い刺客! イリューヒン登場)	June 3, 2004	December 13, 2003	209
The black division match between D-Struction and Comrade Turbinski begins with a bang as D-Struction quickly gains the upper hand over the Russian fighter jet. However, Comrade Turbinski transforms into a jet and flies around the ring, unable to be detected as he occasionally strikes D-Struction with one of his wings. D-Struction twists together his prongs to use as radar to pick up on Turbinski, but the jet is undetectable.
61	"Send in the Clones (Part 1 of 2)"; Transliteration: "Blocks Clone Attack" (Japanese: ブロックス クローン攻撃)	June 10, 2004	January 31, 2004	210
Blocks continues to apply the pressure to Kevin Mask, who appears to be beat, but, mustering up all of his strength, Kevin breaks free from the hold and is back in the match. Blocks reconstructs again into a large, twisting slide where he sends his head flying down like a cannonball, and this knocks Kevin for a loop. Kevin fights back with moves of his own, and soon the match is under his control. That is, until Blocks deconstructs himself and the building blocks begin to encase Kevin's body.
62	"He Who Laughs Last (Part 2 of 2)"; Transliteration: "Revival! Kevin Mask's Great Counterattack" (Japanese: 起死回生! ケビンマスク大反撃)	June 17, 2004	February 7, 2004	211
The "new" Kevin Mask, as he calls himself, laughs as he reverses the hold and traps Blocks against the ropes, clutching until he shatters. Blocks only rebuilds himself again into the Kevin Mask clone, claiming that now that he has Kevin Mask's blueprints, he can turn into the clone any time he wants. The two continue combat, but Kevin Mask gains the upper hand and forces Blocks to revert to his original form. Kevin claims that fighting his clone awakened within him a side that has laid buried for a long time...the dMP within him. After bringing back his bad guy self he brutally attacks Blocks then the match goes Kevin's way but Blocks managing's to defend himself against the brutal Kevin Mask. In a last bid to defeat Kevin, Blocks transforms into a bulldozer and is ready to flatting Kevin but Kevin doesn't move and stops Blocks with a punch into a black piece which is his weakness. Blocks doesn't accept defeat he throws himself at Kevin but Kevin kicks the black piece out of Blocks and defeats Blocks. Kevin Mask advances to the semi-finals.
63	"The Beast Within (Part 1 of 2)"; Transliteration: "Death Match! Jade vs Ricardo" (Japanese: デスマッチ! ジェイドVSヒカルド)	June 24, 2004	February 14, 2004	212
With Jeager and Ricardo's match about to begin, Kid Muscle can't seem to find Roxanne anywhere, so he goes into the change rooms to search for her. Suspicious that she likes Jeager, as they were partners in the Chojin Crown qualifying race, he goes into Jeager's change room and soon learns she is not there. Jeager says that he can't wait to face Kid Muscle in the Chojin Crown semifinals and will do so if he defeats Ricardo.
64	"The Face of Evil (Part 2 of 2)"; Transliteration: "The Worst Situation! What is the Verdict?!" (Japanese: 最悪の事態! 判定はどっちだ?!)	June 30, 2004	February 21, 2004	213
The Match between Jeager and Ricardo continues with Ricardo dominating the match. Using his bracelets he is able to pull the mat to form a point and manages to throw jeager in it. It looks like the match may be over until Jeager uses his most powerful attack the Red Reign of Pain witch makes a direct strike on Ricardo. Now Jeager is in control and is ready for another strike at his opponent. Brocken Jr. warns Jeager not to but in order to prove himself as his own wrestler Jeager attacks anyway which proves to be a deadly error as Ricardo traps Jeager's arm in his chain. Ricardo notices that Brocken Jr and the fans keep Jeager going so he decides to go it alone which he does but in the end Ricardo sets up his Brazilian nutcracker move on Jeager, as Ricardo is descending Jeager's towel is thrown in by Roxanne but despite this Ricardo finishes his move severely injuring Jeager everyone is angry at Ricardo because he had finished his move when the towel was thrown in but Jacqueline stops the arguing tells everyone that Ricardo didn't cheat because the towel was thrown in after Ricardo started his move. Now the stage is set for Kid Muscle vs Ricardo!
65	"A Cold Reception (Part 1 of 4)"; Transliteration: "Grudge Match! Mantaro vs Ricardo" (Japanese: 遺恨試合! 万太郎vsヒカルド)	January 5, 2006	February 28, 2004	214
It's the next day and all the remaining Chojin's are being presented in a parade which all of them try to escape. When that's over they all set to training Comrade Turbinski practices his transforming and stealth attacks, Kevin Mask runs with massive weights on his back (pushed on by his coach), Ricardo is being pulled by two cars one on each arm, or rather he was pulling them, and The Kid was... EATING cheered on by Wally and his mom and sister. The next day the Kid goes to the stadium but is not being introduced. Ikemon catches the Kid and explains that although it is the right address his match is being held outside in the cold and if that's not bad enough a giant X is in the middle of the ring and one touch will give off 10,000 volts of electricity to whoever touches it. Now with the match beginning can the Kid beat Ricardo, avenge Jeager and stay away from the X?
66	"Electrolix (Part 2 of 4)"; Transliteration: "Terrifying! X Ring of Execution" (Japanese: 恐怖! 処刑執行Xリング)	January 12, 2006	March 6, 2004	215
Just as Ricardo is about to slam Kid Muscle right into the Electrolix, he pulls back and throws Kid Muscle over his head, to safety. As the match continues Ricardo is constantly pulling punches, not making any cheap moves, and making sure that the Kid doesn't hit the Electrolix (the big electric X). Ricardo's two dMP teammates, however, are getting angry, and so pull a towel out from under the Kid's feet, causing him to run into Ricardo and send Ricardo into the Electrolix. As Ricardo stands up, he hears his old master in the audience, telling him to stop hiding from who he really is. Ricardo is torn between his two selves, the Muscle League self and dMP self, and insists he is an upstanding member of the Muscle League, fighting the good fight. The match continues, and Ricardo's outfit is beginning to crack as the Kid applies the pressure, and Ricardo finally cracks under the pressure when he hears three of his fellow wrestlers that trained under his master saying that when Ricardo was told he was beginning to become corrupt under dark powers, he killed his master to try and hide it. Ricardo denies this, and finally gives in, becoming Ricardo, the Lord of Darkness, his dMP form. No longer the nice guy, he hurls Kid Muscle into the Electrolix, which results in an explosion.
67	"The Comeback Kid (Part 3 of 4)"; Transliteration: "Their Bond! Power of Friendship Activates!" (Japanese: 二人の絆! 友情パワー発動!)	January 19, 2006	March 13, 2004	216
The Kid collapses after getting shocked by the Electrolix, but somehow manages to stumble to his feet, which Ricardo responds to by striking the Kid's leg. The Kid's ankle is hurt, so Roxanne grabs the belt that had tied she and Jeager together during the Chojin preliminaries and puts it around the Kid's ankle, healing it. Kid Muscle, with Jeager's power within him, fights back against Ricardo, but Ricardo sends Kid Muscle into the Electrolix again; then, for even more punishment, Ricardo picks up Kid Muscle and throws him right back into the Electrolix for a fourth shocking.
68	"The Power of Friendship (Part 4 of 4)"; Transliteration: "Grudge Settled! Who will Advance to the Finals?!" (Japanese: 因縁決着! 決勝進出は誰の手に?!)	January 26, 2006	March 20, 2004	217
The episode starts with a continuation of the previous episode: Kid Muscle is still fighting with Ricardo. After fighting for a little bit, the power of Ultimate Muscle begins to falter, but thanks to Jeager and Roxanne's encouragement, the mark on Kid Muscle's forehead starts glowing brighter than ever, and he takes Ricardo – and the Electrolix – out with the Muscle Millenium. Flash to Kevin Mask and Comrade Turbinski.
69	"Fear of Flying (Part 1 of 2)"; Transliteration: "Irregular Ring! Kevin vs Ilioukhine" (Japanese: 変則リング! ケビンvsイリューヒン)	February 2, 2006	March 27, 2004	218
With Kid Muscle clinching the first of two spots in the Chojin Championship, Kevin Mask and Comrade Turbinske begin a face off to determine who will go on to face him! However this Semi- final match has a twist... it will be played on a five sided wring several stories in the air! As the match begins Kevin Mask catches the comrade off guard with a series of powerful and damaging slaps soon taking the comrade for a powerful smash to the mat. As it looks like the Comrade may lose already he pulls out a secret weapon!
70	"Maelstrom Power (Part 2 of 2)"; Transliteration: "Ultimate! Tactics No. The End" (Japanese: 究極!タクティクスNo.ジ・エンド)	February 9, 2006	April 3, 2004	219
Kevin Mask and Turbinski continue their match. Kevin begins to get pummeled by Turbinski, as he gets suplexed on all five faces of the ring. Next, he begins to fall, but he's saved at the last minute by his foot, which tears into the mat and keeps him barely hanging on. Lord Flash and Kevin Mask regain their trust, and Kevin comes roaring back, as he evades the Comrade's next attack.
71	"Hola El Niño"; Transliteration: "Meat Wounded! The Mysterious New Second Arrives!" (Japanese: ミート重傷! 謎の新セコンド登場!)	February 16, 2006	April 10, 2004	220
Meat and Turbinske are taken out by paramedics, and people cheer for Meat's heroism as Kevin goes off with Lord Flash to train for the final against the Kid. Kid Muscle is frightened (yet again) and has only two weeks before the match, so he goes into hiding. He overhears his father, King Muscle, talking with Roxanne's mother, and hearing how King Muscle was also a coward when it came to facing Robin Mask in the Chojin Crown Final.
72	"Like Father, Like Son (Again)"; Transliteration: "The Night Before the Battle, The Father's Feelings and the Son's Feelings" (Japanese: 決戦前夜 親の思いと子の思い)	February 23, 2006	April 17, 2004	221
The chojin finals are finally about to begin! Kevin Mask and Kid Muscle each prepare for the most important match of their lives. While the two wrestlers prepare, four of the mightiest wrestlers square off in a two on two exhibition match. King Muscle and Terryman vs. Ramanman and Buffalo man. In the end Terryman and the King win over their fellow muscle leaguers. As the match draws closer Kevin Mask sits in his room thinking about his father. The Kid's dad drops off a little gift for his son giving him his old battle uniform to where during the match.
73	"The Final Match (Part 1 of 5)"; Transliteration: "Now the Gong! Hesitation Without Meat" (Japanese: いざゴング! 名参謀ミートなき迷い)	March 2, 2006	April 24, 2004	222
And so it begins... the Final Match of the Chojin Championship, between the two greatest wrestling families in the world. Kid Muscle vs. Kevin Mask. Kevin Mask however does not look like he is able to fight considering he can barely stand, much to The Kid's delight. El Nino though is even more worried by the weakened Mask and instructs Kid not to attack Kevin but to run away. The bell tolls and the match begins but neither wrestler wants to make the first move. Finally Kevin attacks and The Kid runs as instructed, this does not go over well with the fans as they begin to pelt the Kid for his cowardly actions.
74	"Lifting the Mask (Part 2 of 5)"; Transliteration: "Raging Billows Attack, Kevin's Overwhelming Superiority" (Japanese: 怒涛の攻撃 ケビン圧倒的優勢)	March 9, 2006	May 1, 2004	223
Kevin Mask is outraged that his mask has been scarred twice, and El Nino tells the Kid that it is one of the worst things he could have done. Kid Muscle doesn't listen and continues his assault on Kevin, who is simply biding his time through the punches to land a perfect attack. Meat is falling out of his hospital bed as the Kid attempts the Kinniku Driver and the Kinniku Buster, two of his family's best moves, both of which Kevin easily reverses...
75	"Honor Thy Family (Part 3 of 5)"; Transliteration: "Burning Inner Strength vs Maelstrom Power" (Japanese: 火事場のクソ力vs大渦パワー)	March 16, 2006	May 8, 2004	224
SMAASSSHH! Kevin Mask is bashed into a Meatlock Drop that takes him to the turnbuckles. "The Kid's like a thoroughbred racehorse– he comes from a long line of champions, so winnin's in his blood" Terry Kenyon says. Everyone cheers as Kevin Mask and Kid Muscle hang in midair, stuck in the turnbuckle by Kevin Mask's mask spike...
76	"Don't Give Up (Part 4 of 5)"; Transliteration: "Nothing More Can be Done! Muscle Millennium Sinks" (Japanese: 万事休す! マッスルミレニアム撃沈)	March 23, 2006	May 15, 2004	225
Kid Muscle launches the Muscle Millennium, throwing everything he has at Kevin Mask. Kevin, however, uses his Maelstrom Power to successfully reverse the attack and send the Kid slamming down to the mat. Kevin Mask declares the match is over, since he has reversed every single attack that Kid Muscle has. Kid Muscle is ready to give up too, but Roxanne steps in and yells that he needs to keep going. Then, Hollywood Bowl, Barrier-Free Man, the injured Jeager, and even Ricardo arrive at the match to cheer Kid Muscle on, and make sure he doesn't quit. Filled with new strength, the Kid unleashes the power of Ultimate Muscle and throws more attacks at Kevin, then uses the Kinniku Buster to hopefully end the match...
77	"And the Winner Is... (Part 5 of 5)"; Transliteration: "The True Hero! Chojin WGP Settled" (Japanese: 真の勇者! 超人WGP決着)	March 30, 2006	May 22, 2004	226
The final continues with Kid Muscle still in Kevin Mask's hold. The judges give the shoot symbol (that means they think the Olap Assault is an unbeatable move). Kevin Mask twists Kid Muscle's arms so hard that they break. Kid falls to the mat, helpless. All of a sudden, Meat arrives on the scene, telling Kid to get up. Jeager, Ricardo, Barrierfreeman, and Hollywood Bowl all exhort Kid to get up, too. After some crucial wrestler-trainer talking, Kid pops his arms back into their sockets, and goes back into the fray against Kevin...
