= Image Entertainment Corporation =

Canadian animation production company

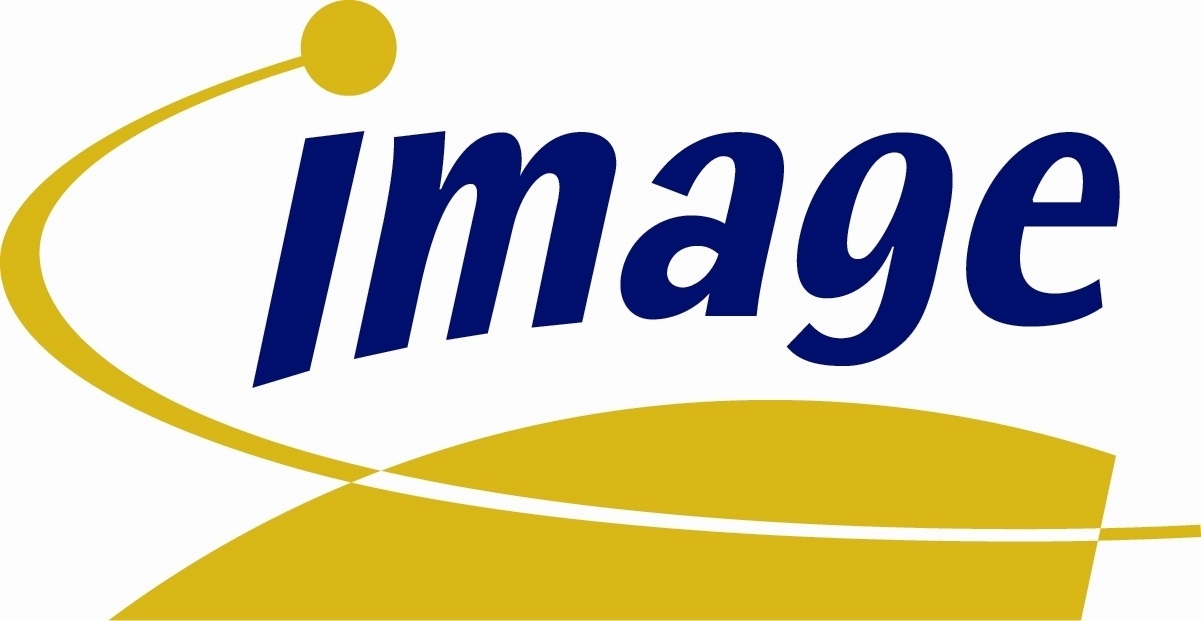
- The logo used since 2011
- Trade name: Marathon Media - coproductions
- Type: Private
- Industry: Entertainment
- Founded: 2000; 26 years ago
- Founder: Sylvain Viau
- Headquarters: Montreal, Quebec, Canada
- Key people: Sylvain Viau (President); Pierre Thellend (Head of Business Development); Guylaine Robidoux (Production Manager); Susane Belec (Production Manager)
- Products: Walter; Walter & Tandoori I; Walter & Tandoori II; Walter !; Walter's Christmas
- Production output: The Amazing Spiez!; Totally Spies!; Martin Mystery; Monster Buster Club; Walter; Team Galaxy; Spyworld
- Owner: Sylvain Viau
- Number of employees: 11
- Website: image-icc.com

Image Entertainment Corporation is a Canadian animation production company based in Montreal, Quebec, Canada. the company was founded in 2000 by company president Sylvain Viau and specializes in 2D and 3D animation for international clientele. As of 2014, they are developing a new children's series called Spyworld.

== Productions ==
- Martin Mystery (2003–2006) - co-produced by Marathon Media and RAI Fiction
- Team Galaxy (2006–2007) - co-produced with Marathon Media and RAI Fiction
- Totally Spies! (Season 3–5) (2004–2008) - co-produced with Marathon Media
- Monster Buster Club (2007–2009) - co-produced with Marathon Media and Jetix Europe
- The Amazing Spiez! (2009–2012) - co-produced with Marathon Media
- Walter and Tandoori (2005–2010) - co-produced with Oasis Entertainment
- Walter's Christmas (2011 film) - co-produced by Alliance Films)
- Farrah The Magical Farrah (2008-2015) - co-produced by Image Entertainment Corporation

=== In Development ===
- Spyworld - co-produced Telefilm Canada
