= Martin Mystery =

French-Canadian animated television series

- Martin Mystère
- Genre: Horror; Comedy drama; Mystery; Science fantasy; Action-adventure
- Created by: Vincent Chalvon-Demersay; David Michel
- Based on: Martin Mystère by Alfredo Castelli
- Developed by: David Michel; Séverine Vuillaume; Vincent Chalvon-Demersay
- Written by: Michelle Lamoureux; Robert Lamoureux; Vincent Chalvon-Demersay; David Michel; Rhonda Smiley; Nicole Demerse; Ben Joseph; Frank Young; Rob Hoegee
- Directed by: Stephane Berry; Gregory Panaccione
- Voices of: Sam Vincent; Kelly Sheridan; Teryl Rothery; Dale Wilson
- Theme music composer: David Vadant; Noam Kaniel
- Opening theme: "Martin Mystery Theme"
- Composers: Fabrice Aboulker; Pascale Stive
- Countries of origin: France; Canada; Italy
- Original languages: French; English
- No. of seasons: 3
- No. of episodes: 66 (list of episodes)

Production
- Executive producers: Vincent Chalvon-Demersay; Sylvain Viau; Stephane Berry (season 3)
- Producers: Vincent Chalvon-Demersay; David Michel
- Editors: Martin Tremblay; Yves Lescoeur (season 1)
- Running time: 22 minutes
- Production companies: Marathon Animation; Rai Fiction; Image Entertainment Corporation; Merchandising Media GmbH (seasons 1–2)

Original release
- Network: M6 (France); Canal J (France); YTV (Canada); Vrak (Canada)
- Release: 1 October 2003 – 27 March 2006

Martin Mystery (French: Martin Mystère) is an animated television series based on the Italian comic book Martin Mystère by Alfredo Castelli. The show was produced by Marathon Animation (French television production company based in Neuilly-sur-Seine), Rai Fiction (Italian company) and Image Entertainment Corporation (a Canadian production and animation company based in Montreal). Like its sister show Totally Spies!, it uses an art style similar to Japanese anime. The series premiered on YTV on 1 October 2003 in Canada.

== Premise ==
The series re-imagines the comic books' main characters Martin Mystery and Diana Lombard as teenage stepsiblings attending Torrington Academy, a boarding school located in the city of Sherbrooke, Quebec. They work for a secret organization known as "The Center," which covertly protects the people of Earth from extraterrestrial and supernatural threats and investigates the unknown and the paranormal. Their allies at The Center include Billy, a small, green-skinned alien who is one of Martin's best friends; and Java, a caveman from 200,000 years ago, who works as a janitor at Torrington Academy and is the muscles of the group.

Martin's vast knowledge of the supernatural and his remarkable intuition make him a valued agent of The Center, and compensate for his huge ego and his clumsy attitude. Diana resents these flaws at times, as Martin often does not seem to understand the seriousness of his missions, but generally respects him, and loves him and his way of being himself without compromises.

== Episodes ==
Season	Episodes	Originally released	
Season	Episodes	First released	Last released
1	26	October 1, 2003	August 12, 2004
2	14	August 28, 2004	October 27, 2004
3	26	January 2, 2005	March 27, 2006

== Characters ==
Martin Mystery
Martin is a 16-year-old Canadian boy, with a passion for monsters and the paranormal, who works as a paranormal investigator for The Center. He is immature, hyperactive, and zany, constantly bursting with energy. He is usually an underachiever in school, once getting 106 out of 902 on his pre-college aptitude test. While impulsive and impatient – often leaping into danger on missions without thinking to help those in peril – he consistently proves to be a quick thinker and clever. He has a peculiar love for everything slimy, sloppy, and gooey – things that make Diana gag. His favorite pastime is taunting Diana badly by playing practical jokes. A running gag in the series is his constant flirting with every beautiful girl he meets, who usually reject him.
Martin jumps to conclusions very often, coming up with every unlikely theory he can think of, usually from some horror movie or monster movie he saw, or from his subscription to Paranormal Monthly. As the leader of the trio, Martin is also the only one who wears a U-Watch. His first monster was Venoso, a female chameleon monster that has the power to shape-shift into any person it wants.
Martin appears in a crossover episode of Totally Spies!. During the episode, he is immediately smitten with Clover, even though she is uninterested in him. Towards the end of the same episode, Clover finally showed interests in Martin and even tries to get his attention, but Martin and Alex have hit it off due to a shared love of comics and video games. Throughout the episode, Martin continuously describes Sam as a "really lame buzz-kill", but does not lash out at him due to her composed demeanor.

Diana Lombard
Diana is Martin's stepsister, who is his complete opposite. She is also 16 years old and an agent for The Center, while attending Torrington Academy. She is a rigid overachiever, and often has a hard time keeping her cool with Martin. The stepsiblings argue frequently, with such arguments ending in some sort of bet that Diana usually loses. Diana can be timid at times – which leads to Martin calling her a "wimp" – but can show great courage when called upon. Her intelligence often comes in handy on their missions. Never sharing Martin's love of the paranormal, she often tries to reason with logic instead of jumping to conclusions.
Diana is often used as "bait" for the majority of their missions, which results in her being a victim of the monster. Such examples include: being cocooned by an acid-spewing insect queen, turned into a frog by a warlock Martin unleashed, and being possessed by a vengeful spirit at a mountain lodge. When Martin is incapacitated by other monsters, she uses her own skills to save him, and even wears Martin's U-watch in a few episodes.

Java the Caveman
Java is a 200,000-year-old caveman, who assists Martin and Diana in their investigations as the team's tracker. Friends with both, he often works odd jobs at Torrington. While he does not usually contribute much to conversation due to his simplistic English (e.g. "What that?", "Diana bald", and "Java no like this place"), his brute strength and creative thinking often help in the team's investigations.
Java is a significant source of comedy in the show, due to his reactions to various scenarios and his poor hygiene as a caveman (e.g. his offensive foot odor, putrid armpits, and filthy breath). His technophobia also provides some running gags. His backstory was revealed in the episode "Return of the Beasts". Java was created by an evil ex-paleontologist who sought revenge. Java was apprehended by the Center, quickly befriended Martin and Diana, and helped them stop the paleontologist and his mutant dinosaurs and Java has been a part of the team ever since.

M.O.M.
The director of The Center. M.O.M. oversees the investigation of paranormal activities throughout the world. Serious, uncompromising, and an expert at hand-to-hand combat, she is often seen multitasking. While Martin's capabilities make him one of her favorite agents, she is often annoyed by his childish behavior. A running gag in the series is Martin destroying nearly every piece of gadgetry she is working on whenever he appears for a debriefing in her office.
As an agent, the first creature she captured was Gastromo, a parasitic, iron-eating, slug-like monster who infects and controls those he touches. Contrary to the dry sense of humor she provides to the series, Billy has said she is "a real party animal when she gets going". In one episode, Martin and Diana discover she turns The Center into a nightclub afterhours for agents, and they see her dancing. And despite her rather serious and stoic nature, she is always in a happy and festive mood at Christmas, to which a disbelieving Martin comments that it looks like "M.O.M. is actually having fun".
In the crossover episode of Totally Spies!, M.O.M. is shown to have a possibly romantic history with the spies' boss Jerry, much to the spies' and Martin's displeasure, as she and Jerry spy-flirt between holograms. The initials M.O.M. are said to actually stand for "Mystery Organization Manager", as explained by Martin in that episode. While her real name is unknown, she used the alias Ms. Olivia Mandell (derived from the initials M.O.M.) in the episode "Web of the Spider Creature".

Billy
Billy is M.O.M.'s personal secretary; he is a tiny green alien often seen flying on his mini hovercraft. Friendly and upbeat, he usually greets the gang when they are first signed in, and often does his signature high five with Martin (whom he idolizes). His role is generally a supportive one; he often pops in to give the team valuable information, usually startling them in the process. He will also analyse samples or photographs that Martin sends in during a mission. However, he will not help on a mission directly unless he is forced to.
In the second season, it was revealed Billy was once the great alien warrior Ganthar on another planet, who led other aliens to conquer planets and strip them of their resources, but he gave up violence for good after realizing what he did was wrong. On his home planet, he was a supermodel, likely popular since he was fearsome and powerful. Billy arrived on Earth in the Roswell Incident in 1947. In later episodes (season 3 onward), Billy adopted a human disguise — the "B.S. 1000" — to be with Martin and Diana at their school. There are a few later episodes that hint Billy has romantic feelings for Diana.

=== Recurring ===
Jenni Anderson
Diana's friend and Martin's crush. Jenni is one of the prettiest and most popular girls attending Torrington. She has blue eyes and flared auburn-coloured hair, usually seen wearing a black blouse and skirt with knee-high boots. Martin is in love with her, which she does not return due to his immaturity. She regularly describes him as "immature", a "freak", and a "loser". However, there are times she becomes interested in him, particularly when Martin acts like a gentleman. Unfortunately for Martin, this never lasts due to her memory being erased, or Martin subsequently doing something stupid.

Marvin
Martin's rival. The son of a pilot, Marvin enjoys the extreme, saying that he enjoys the adrenaline rush that comes with such activities. Some of his activities includes rock climbing in the Himalayas, parasailing over the Great Barrier Reef, street-luging on the German Autobahn, jungle kayaking, and snowboarding down the face of K2. His talents and popularity make everyone at the school fawn over him, while making Martin jealous.
In "The Third Eye", Marvin is recruited to work for The Center, which annoys Martin. At the end of "Body-Swappers", he is relocated to Hawaii as a reward for his work on the mission. However, in "Rage of the Leprechaun", he is relegated to The Center's South Pole facility because of his negligence in a previous mission, and blames his unfortunate circumstances on Martin.

Gerard Mystery
Martin's father, and Diana's stepfather. The complete opposite of his son, Gerard is a very rational, logical person. As a scientist, he spends much of his time doing field work in the forest. He and Martin have a strained relationship, partly due to Gerard considering Martin's interest in the paranormal to be "balderdash". He only appeared in three episodes; in his second appearance, he finds out about The Center and that Diana and Martin work for it. Diana's mother, Martin's stepmother, is only mentioned once in season three.

== Broadcast ==
Martin Mystery aired in Canada on YTV and Discovery Kids in English, and on Vrak in French, from 2003 until the series finale in 2006.

In the United States, the first 7 episodes were originally shown on the FoxBox in May and June 2004. Nickelodeon later picked up the series, and after a brief run on the main channel, the series aired on Nicktoons Network from 4 July 2005 until 27 April 2008.

=== In other markets ===
Other channels that aired the show included M6 in France, Rai 2 in Italy, and Jetix throughout Europe (excluding Italy and Poland). Additional channels in Europe included SVT1 and SVT Barnkanalen in Sweden, NRK Super in Norway, Yle TV2 in Finland, Alter Channel in Greece, GMA Network and Q (now known as GTV) in the Philippines, VT4 in Belgium and ZigZap in Poland. In Sri Lanka, the series was aired by Channel Eye of the Sri Lanka Rupavahini Corporation.

MBC 3, Ajyal TV, and ART 3 broadcast this show in Arabic throughout the Middle East, with the voice talents of Mo'awad Ismail as Martin and Mariam El Khesht as Diana.

=== Home media ===
Home video of Martin Mystery was distributed in France by PolyGram and MK2. In Italy, home video was distributed by 01 Distribution. Home video for the English version of season 1 was also released in Canada and the United States, but has become a rarity in recent years.

== Crossovers with other series ==
Background characters resembling Martin, Diana, and Marvin have appeared on other series produced by Marathon and Image, such as Team Galaxy, Totally Spies!, and The Amazing Spiez!.

In 2007, a year after the series ended, the characters of Martin and M.O.M appeared on a fifth season episode of Totally Spies!. In the episode "Totally Mystery Much?", Martin helps the team investigate a series of Yeti sightings in Antarctica. None of the other Martin Mystery characters appeared in the episode, although Diana was mentioned.

== Future ==
The series ended production after its third season, with 66 episodes being aired.

In December 2013, a possible "new season project" was announced on the official Martin Mystery Facebook page. As of 2025, there has been no further announcement or plans for such. However, there have been talks about a potential digital remaster and re-release of the series in 16:9 widescreen.

On 10 October 2023, it was announced a new animated series is currently in the works. No further announcement for such has been made since.

== Reception ==
Common Sense Media wrote of the series, "Scooby-Doo meets X-Files; tweens OK."
