= The Enemy Within =

The Enemy Within may refer to:

== Books ==
- The Enemy Within (Kennedy book), by Robert F. Kennedy, 1960
- The Enemy Within (play), by Brian Friel, 1962
- The Enemy Within, 1986 Volume 3 of L. Ron Hubbard's Mission Earth series
- The Enemy Within (Milne book), by Seumas Milne, 1994
- The Enemy Within (novel), by Christie Golden, 1994
- The Enemy Within (Savage book), by Michael Savage, 2003
- Hitman: Enemy Within, a 2007 novelization of the video game Hitman
- The Enemy Within: Terror, Lies, and the Whitewashing of Omar Khadr by Ezra Levant, 2011
- The Enemy Within (Rusch novel), by Kristine Kathryn Rusch, 2014
- Enemies Within: Communists, the Cambridge Spies and the Making of Modern Britain by Richard Davenport-Hines, 2018
- The Enemy Within: How the ANC Lost the Battle Against Corruption by Mpumelelo Mkhabela, 2022.

== Film ==
- The Enemy Within (1918 film), a 1918 Australian silent film
- The Enemy Within (1994 film), an HBO thriller starring Forest Whitaker
- Doctor Who: The Enemy Within (1996 film), FOX TV network telefilm
- The Enemy Within (2013 film), a 2013 Greek film

== Music ==
- "The Enemy Within", a song by Rush from the album Grace Under Pressure
- Enemy Within (album), a 1986 album by Chris Spedding
- "Enemy Within", a 1989 song by D.R.I. from Thrash Zone
- "The Enemy Within", a 1996 song by Cherry Poppin' Daddies from Kids on the Street
- The Enemy Within, a 1998 album by Concord Dawn
- "Enemy Within", a 2001 song by Arch Enemy from Wages of Sin

== Television ==
- Doctor Who (film), a 1996 television movie based on the British science fiction series Doctor Who, alternatively titled Enemy Within
- The Enemy Within (TV series), a 2019 American television series

=== Episodes ===
- "The Enemy Within" (Star Trek: The Original Series), 1966
- "The Enemy Within" (MacGyver), 1986
- "The Enemy Within" (Stargate SG-1), 1997
- "Enemy Within" (Law & Order: Criminal Intent), 2001
- "The Enemy Within" (NCIS), 2015
- "The Enemy Within" (Under the Dome), 2015
- "The Enemy Within" (Suspects), the six-part fifth series, 2016

== Other ==
- The Enemy Within Campaign, a 1986 series of adventures for Warhammer Fantasy Roleplay
  - The Enemy Within (Warhammer Fantasy Roleplay), introduction to The Enemy Within Campaign
- "The Enemy Within", a 2002 article by Gore Vidal about the 9/11 attacks
- "The Enemy Within", a 2010 article by Mark Bowden about the Conficker Worm
- "XCOM: Enemy Within", a 2013 expansion pack to the 2012 video game XCOM: Enemy Unknown
- "Batman: The Enemy Within", a 2017 point and click adventure video game developed by Telltale games

== See also ==
- "The Enemy Within the Gates", a 1968 radio and television episode of Dad's Army
- The Enemy Inside (disambiguation)
- Fifth column – Group of people who undermine a larger group from within
