= The Enemy Within (Mkhabela book) =

2022 non-fiction book by Mpumelelo Mkhabela

The Enemy Within: How the ANC lost the battle against corruption
- Author: Mpumelelo Mkhabela
- Language: English
- Subject: African National Congress, Corruption in South Africa, Politics of South Africa
- Genre: Non-fiction
- Publisher: Tafelberg
- Publication date: July 2022
- Publication place: South Africa
- Pages: 208
- ISBN: 9780624091226

The Enemy Within: How the ANC lost the battle against corruption (2022) is a book by Mpumelelo Mkhabela, a South African journalist and political analyst. The book is an account of how corruption entrenched itself within South Africa's governing party, the African National Congress (ANC) and the party's failed efforts to fight it.

== Synopsis ==
The book starts with an introductory account of how the ANC dealt with one of the first serious incidents of corruption the party had to deal with following its ascent to power; the expulsion of Bantu Holomisa from the ANC after requesting that the former Transkei Prime Minister and ANC Minister for Public Enterprises, Stella Sigcau be investigated for corruption.

Mkhabela focuses on the ANC's "new cadre" policy wherein loyal party members were deployed in important positions in government and state-owned enterprises; what the long-term impact of this policy was and how it greatly contributed to the growth of corruption within the party. Mkhabela does this by detailing a number of well-publicised ANC corruption scandals that occurred during the presidencies of Nelson Mandela, Thabo Mbeki, Jacob Zuma, and Cyril Ramaphosa. These scandals include the Tony Yengeni controversy, the disbandment of the Scorpions, the Gupta family, Jackie Selebi, and corruption within the Zuma administration generally.

In the book, Mkhabela argues that by tolerating corrupt practices and shielding ANC members accused of corruption from prosecution or accountability the party allowed corruption to become entrenched in the party and, by extension, in the South African government. Mkhabela also points out how, paradoxically, the presidency of Jacob Zuma was the most vocal about fighting corruption within the ANC even though it was also regarded as the most corrupt. The book ends with asking if South Africa will be able to deal with corruption before it destroys the country.

== Reception ==
Political scientist, poet and ANC member Keith Gottschalk described the book as "the latest in a cascade of publications over the last decade that record corruption and theft by leading politicians in the country’s ruling party" and stated that in a less free or democratic society the author of such a book would be arrested and harassed. The South African political news website Polity states that the book "tells a fascinating and gripping story, starting with Mandela" of how corruption grew in South Africa.
