= The Power Within =

The Power Within may refer to:

- The Power Within (album), a 2012 album by DragonForce
- The Power Within (1995 film), a karate film directed by Art Camacho
- The Power Within (1979 film), an American TV film
- The Power Within (1921 film), an American silent drama film
