= List of Martin Mystery episodes =

This list contains the details of 66 episodes of the animated television series Martin Mystery, which aired over three seasons between 2003 and 2006 on Kids Street.

== Series overview ==
Season	Episodes	Originally released	
Season	Episodes	First released	Last released
1	26	October 1, 2003	August 12, 2004
2	14	August 28, 2004	October 27, 2004
3	26	January 2, 2005	March 27, 2006

== Episodes ==
=== Season 1 (2003–04) ===
No. overall	No. in season	Title	Written by	Villains/Monsters	Original release date
1	1	"It Came from the Bog"	Vincent Chalvon-Demersay	The Bogeyman	October 1, 2003
Martin, Diana, and Java are sent to France to stop a storybook creature named the Bogeyman from kidnapping "naughty" children as punishment, and taking them to his storybook bog world.
2	2	"Terror from the Sky"	Vincent Chalvon-Demersay	Mutated Meganeura; Mutated Insect Queen	October 8, 2003
Martin has to stop mysterious insects that are attacking a remote town in the Alberta Badlands with the aid of an acid-spewing queen, and a radioactive meteorite from the Andromeda Galaxy.
3	3	"The Creeping Slime"	Rob Hoegee	The Black Spirit	October 15, 2003
Oil rig workers in the South Pacific Ocean start to go missing, their bodies fed on by a huge creature completely covered in slime controlled by a wicked shaman plotting revenge on them for polluting his island.
4	4	"Curse of the Deep"	Rhonda Smiley	Leviathan	October 29, 2003
Martin, Diana, and Java are in Monte Carlo to help guard a treasure that belonged to an ancient tribe that mysteriously disappeared. However, a nearby Leviathan wants to eat them while looking for the treasure.
5	5	"Mark of the Shapeshifter"	Rhonda Smiley	Massey Wolf Spirit; Netherworld Wolves	November 5, 2003
Workers on a building project near Toronto go missing because a local Indigenous person, turned into a werewolf, is transporting them to a werewolf dimension.
6	6	"Mystery of the Vanishing"	Julie Lacey	The Applebyes, Zook the Dragon	November 12, 2003
Martin, Diana, and Java end up in an alternate world with a mysterious family named the Applebyes and a dragon named Zook who feeds on humans' life force every several years.
7	7	"It Came from Inside the Box"	Jessica Wright	The Chaos Beast	November 19, 2003
Mysterious things go on in a remote town in Oregon and Martin soon finds out that a chaos beast is behind all the mayhem. It's up to Martin, Diana, and Java to save the day.
8	8	"Attack of the Sandman"	Nicole Demerse	Sandman	November 26, 2003
Martin, Diana, and Java investigate a research facility at a university in Vancouver and soon encounter The Sandman, a dream manipulating creature who traps people in their worst nightmares forever. Meanwhile, Diana becomes addicted to sugar while studying for midterms. When Martin bets her to give up cold turkey, she struggles to.
9	9	"Shriek from Beyond"	Anne-Marie Perotta & Tean Schultz	Siren	December 3, 2003
Martin, Diana, and Java are sent to investigate a town in Newfoundland and Labrador that is being attacked by a siren. They soon realize that a sailor had a special, but very short relationship with the siren. So the siren seeks revenge.
10	10	"Eternal Christmas"	Nicole Demerse	Clifford, Christmas Demons of the Snow Globe Creatures	December 17, 2003
A mystical snow globe is in the possession of an owner named Clifford of a shop in the Laurentians who wants to have a "perfect Christmas." Soon the snow globe's contents are released but are actually evil.
11	11	"Return of the Dark Druid"	Jeffrey Alan Schechter	The Dark Druid	January 7, 2004
An evil druid wants to have his revenge on the people of a town in Scotland by turning them into trees.
12	12	"Nightmare of the Coven"	Scott Kraft	Prindella Grizzwalda Dorey	January 14, 2004
Martin, Diana, and Java are sent to an all-girls college in Cap Ferrat, France to investigate the disappearance of the school's principal. The trio soon discover that the new principal is actually a witch and starts turning the students, including Diana, into witches.
13	13	"They Lurk Beneath"	Anne-Marie Perotta & Tean Schultz	Nazca Aliens	January 28, 2004
An archaeologist, Professor Melanie Samson, accidentally releases an ancient civilization of aliens that has been living underneath the Nazca Lines in Peru, who want to conquer the Earth.
14	14	"Curse of the Necklace"	Ann MacNaughton	Carlin; Raven	February 17, 2004
A young woman in Prince Edward Island is possessed by an evil spirit named Carlin. Now Java, Billy, Diana, and Martin have to stop her from turning trick-or-treaters into their costumes, though this is hindered when Martin is turned into a baby as he was wearing a baby costume.
15	15	"Haunting of the Blackwater"	Simon Racioppa & Richard Elliott	Philus Blackwater	March 3, 2004
The ghost of a former lodge owner begins to haunt his lodge in British Columbia and Martin, Diana, and Java must find a way to vanquish him when Diana is possessed by the spirit. Note: The plot of this episode was inspired by The Shining
16	16	"Mystery of the Hole Creature"	Rhonda Smiley	Dr. Green; Nadu the Spirit of Darkness	April 13, 2004
Martin, Diana, and Java are sent to an Indian temple in Mohenjodaro to stop an evil scientist from retrieving its treasure and spirit of darkness, Nadu.
17	17	"Fright from the Ice"	Skander Halim	Icetopis	April 20, 2004
An ancient ice monster is threatening a mountain resort in the French Alps (Swiss alps in its initial airing), so Martin, Diana, and Java must find a way to stop it before it turns them into ice.
18	18	"Beast from Within"	Ben Joseph & Franklin Young	Gastromo	April 27, 2004
A slug monster named Gastromo escapes from a cell in The Center and makes Martin, Java, and M.O.M its hosts. Diana is the only one who can save them.
19	19	"Revenge of the Doppelganger"	Anne-Marie Perotta & Tean Schultz	Doppelgänger	May 4, 2004
A woman expels her doppelganger and it starts going on a rampage around Montreal, stealing any other woman's face that looks like her, including Diana's.
20	20	"The Return of the Beasts"	Vincent Chalvon-Demersay, David Michel & Séverine Vuillaume	Dr. Tony Dolphus; Prehistoric Mutant Dinosaur Creatures	May 11, 2004
Diana and Martin remember how they first met Java. Martin got two days of detention for releasing frogs from a container, and Diana ends up in detention as well even though she did nothing wrong. She also has to help him catch the frogs which are still in the classroom. An evil paleontologist, Dr. Dolphus, recreates mutant dinosaurs to take over the Earth, and he creates Java.
21	21	"Attack of the Mothman"	Rhonda Smiley	Mothman	May 18, 2004
A French school student falls victim to an illegal experiment and is transformed into a moth-like creature. He soon seeks revenge on those who transformed him.
22	22	"Summer Camp Nightmare"	John Slama	Sauros	May 25, 2004
Martin, Diana, and Java are sent to a summer camp in British Columbia to destroy a lizard alien that is feeding on the life force of the campers.
23	23	"The Sewer Thing"	Scott Kraft	Ratman	June 8, 2004
A research facility custodian is exposed to a dangerous chemical, transforming him into the Ratman. He seeks revenge on the scientists who transformed him.
24	24	"Scream from the Forest"	Jeffrey Alan Schechter	Synths	July 8, 2004
Martin and Diana take a vacation from the center to go camping with Martin's father Gerard in the forests of Quebec. However, an alien family called the Synths take them hostage as they try to reclaim their territory.
25	25	"The Amazon Vapor"	Nicole Demerse	Highly Evolved Bacteria	July 15, 2004
The Amazon's ecosystem is mysteriously dying because of a strange gas that is poisoning the jungle. During this mission Marvin eventually discovers his and Diana's paranormal secret.
26	26	"The Awakening"	Rob Hoegee	The First Chinese Emperor; Wu-Long the Chinese Sorcerer	August 22, 2004
An ancient Chinese servant tries to revive an ancient emperor and his warriors in order to revive the dynasty.

=== Season 2 (2004) ===
No. overall	No. in season	Title	Written by	Villains/Monsters	Original release date
27	1	"They Came from Outer Space - Part 1"	Ben Joseph & Franklin Young	Freeform Aliens	August 28, 2004
People living in New Mexico near the Los Lunas nuclear power plant wake up w/ missing hair and teeth, and also seem to be appearing in two places at once. When Martin, Diana, and Java arrive to investigate, they find some evidence of alien involvement that freaks Billy out and forces him to reveal his hidden past as Ganthar, the leader of a gang of extraterrestrial pirates.
28	2	"They Came from Outer Space - Part 2"	Ben Joseph & Franklin Young	Freeform Aliens	August 29, 2004
M.O.M. reveals Billy's hidden life as Ganthar, destroyer of worlds, before he abandoned his old name, form, and way of life and joined the Center. She sends the gang to trade the captured aliens for Billy, unaware that once the aliens reunite, they will be able to call in reinforcements and destroy the Earth! The only one who can stop them is Billy, but to do that he will have to become Ganthar again— and he might not want to change back.
29	3	"Attack of the Slime People"	Dale Schott	Slime Replicas, Space Fungus Creature	September 6, 2004
Martin, Diana, and Java investigate a small western town in Utah whose entire population seems to have disappeared overnight. Suddenly, the people return to the town, but they all seem a little different. Note: The plot of this episode was inspired by Invasion of the Body Snatchers
30	4	"The Vampire Returns"	Rob Hoegee	Vampire; Simone de Bastien	September 8, 2004
Martin and the gang are off to France to check out the mysterious disappearance of two teens on a boat ride. When they learn that one of the missing teens works at a surf shop, they head there to check it out, and find a vampire who is sucking the souls out of people. She captures Martin, who is revealed to be the descendant of her husband, and forces Diana, Billy, and Java to go and rescue him before the vampires can unleash their brethren from the Banished Realm.
31	5	"Crypt of the Djini"	Ben Joseph & Franklin Young	Djini	September 12, 2004
At the National Museum of Brunel (a Brunei parody), a robber is surrounded by a mysterious green mist before being transformed into a monster. The group is sent to investigate. They discover that they are up against a genie who wants revenge on the descendant of the man who captured her. Java and Diana are rendered helpless by the genie's power. Can Martin stop the Djini before it is too late?
32	6	"You Do Voodoo"	Simon Racioppa & Richard Elliott	Montgomery Stokes	September 15, 2004
After Martin claims Diana to be a "goody two-shoes", she drastically changes into a "bad girl" image to prove him wrong. At the Center, M.O.M. tells them that there was a bizarre attack on the mayor of Stillwater, Louisiana by an invisible force and sends them to investigate. After a few more weird events they discover that a corrupt politician is using Voodoo Dolls to eliminate his competition. He intends to win the mayoral race, and end up in the mayor's office, an office that was built to conceal an evil Shaman's lair. Once he harnesses the power of an ancient artifact hidden below he will become an unstoppable voodoo priest!
33	7	"Zombie Island"	John Slama	Hexan	September 22, 2004
Martin, Diana, and Java are sent to a Caribbean resort where people have gone missing. They find out that there is an evil undead water monster that turns his victims into zombies.
34	8	"The Lost Tribe"	Ron Degenova	Alpha-Omega	September 29, 2004
Looking for two missing Center agents in the Sahara strands the gang in the long lost underground city of Alpha-Omega. The Alpha-Omegans mistake the bald-headed (thanks to a hairdressing accident by Jenni) Diana for their lost Queen named Oona. She is the sign they have been waiting for to begin their conquest of the surface world.
35	9	"Monster Movie Mayhem"	Simon Racioppa & Richard Elliott	The Beasts of the Perigee (Giant Ants; Werewolf; Robot; Flytrap creature; Beach-Beast)	October 3, 2004
Martin's attempts at filming his own horror movie are interrupted when a giant ant emerges from the screen of the local drive-in which is showing an old sci-fi movie about giant insects. Martin and Diana soon discover a 500-year curse is bringing imaginary monsters to life, and since Java was playing the creature in Martin's movie he has been transformed into a real radioactive swamp zombie. To make matters worse, if the monsters are not all defeated by sunrise they will become indestructible, and Torrington Academy will never be rid of them.
36	10	"The Third Eye"	Rob Hoegee	Seers, Rasel	October 10, 2004
While Marvin has left Torrington, Martin is irked that everyone (particularly Jenny) is still talking about him rather than paying attention to his extreme sports stunts. So his jealousy kicks into overdrive when he discovers that M.O.M. has made Marvin a Center agent and assigned him to work with Martin and Diana on their latest mission to investigate odd incidents at the Scopes Institute (a school for the blind), located in British Columbia. With Marvin out to flaunt his superiority, Martin seething with jealousy, and Diana drooling over Marvin, is anyone on the team focused enough to figure out what is really going on before the banished sorcerers called the Seers succeed in returning to spread chaos across the Earth?
37	11	"The Body-Swapper"	Rhonda Smiley	The Strange Organism Body-Swapper	October 17, 2004
M.O.M. and Diana decide to break Martin of his habit of always borrowing their stuff. But that is soon overshadowed by problems at the Center's base in the Canadian Arctic where Martin has the choice of co-operating with his old rival Marvin, (who blames Martin for his transfer to the frozen tundra), or becoming a host for the bodysnatching creature that has been accidentally unearthed and is growing stronger with every host it takes. Note: The plot of this episode was inspired by The Thing.
38	12	"Germs from Beyond"	Michelle & Robert Lamoreaux	The Bogeyman	October 21, 2004
While sick with a mysterious illness, Martin, Java, and Diana are quarantined in the Center's medical wing and reminisce about their past adventures. Due to a misunderstanding, they think M.O.M has decided to terminate them before they can spread the sickness. They flee deeper into the Center unaware that the real cause of the alarm is that the Bogeyman has escaped and they are heading right for him!
39	13	"They Came from the Gateway - Part 1"	Rhonda Smiley	The Gateway Creatures; The Gatekeeper	October 26, 2004
When M.O.M. fails to return from her vacation in Tibet, Billy calls in Martin, Diana, and Java to investigate (despite the fact that Martin has been temporarily suspended from the Center). They uncover what M.O.M. was really up to — she was on a secret mission to unlock the Gateway to the Underworld!
40	14	"They Came from the Gateway - Part 2"	Ben Joseph & Franklin Young	The Gateway Creatures; The Gatekeeper	October 27, 2004
It is the final episode of the season and things are looking pretty final as monsters appear all over the world and overwhelm all the Center's agents, while the now evil M.O.M. and the Gatekeeper unite to destroy the gang. Is this the end of the line for the gang and the Center?

=== Season 3 (2005–06) ===
No. overall	No. in season	Title	Written by	Villains/Monsters	Original release date
41	1	"Curse of the Looking Glass"	Jeffrey Alan Schechter	Crispangores	January 2, 2005
Darla, a nerdy and lonely girl in Torrington, finds a mirror that makes her pretty "like the Jenni's of the world". But every boy she touches turns into a monster. Meanwhile, Billy has a new gadget that enables him to blend in with the group and helps the team in this mission.
42	2	"Mystery of Teen Town"	Ben Joseph & Franklin Young	Vargos	January 5, 2005
A boy in a New Brunswick town discovers a mystery website with a trapped evil alien that uses the energy of others to get out of his internet prison. Note: The plot of this episode is similar to Children of the Corn.
43	3	"Attack of the Evil Roommate"	Nicole Demerse	Diana's Clones	May 19, 2005
Martin orders some paranormal objects from a website. Almost all of them are fake, except one which, when Diana breaks it, creates another Diana.
44	4	"Web of the Spider Creature"	Jeff Biederman	Mr.Black/Mutated Spider	June 26, 2005
Torrington's old biology teacher, Mr. Black, allows himself to be bitten by a spider, transforming into a half-spider, half-human creature to get revenge on the staff who forced him into retirement.
45	5	"Attack of the Lawn Gnomes"	Ben Joseph & Franklin Young	Lawn Gnomes	August 3, 2005
Some teens stole a lawn gnome from an old lady's garden in Ontario. The gnomes come to life and turn everyone into lawn gnomes until they get the missing gnome back.
46	6	"Rise of the Sea Mutants"	Rhonda Smiley	The Sea Mutants	August 10, 2005
A boy decides to raise sea monkeys, but when the sea monkeys do not appear he flushes the packet down the toilet, where they reach polluted water and become sea mutants.
47	7	"Hairier and Scarier"	Rhonda Smiley	Phantom Werewolf	September 6, 2005
Martin is scratched by the Phantom Werewolf when he cleans the Center's cages. Soon afterwards, the Phantom Werewolf escapes and turns Torrington's students into werewolves.
48	8	"Wrath of the Torrington Worm"	Richard Clark	Torrington Worm	September 13, 2005
Gerard accidentally releases and is swallowed by a prehistoric worm, which Martin caught. What's worse, if Martin does not stop the worm soon, his father's and the worm's DNA will become merged forever.
49	9	"The Warlock Returns"	Rhonda Smiley	Morcan the Warlock	October 14, 2005
Martin releases an evil warlock named Morcan in order to win a competition.
50	10	"Return of the Imaginary Friend"	Nicole Demerse	Teddy	October 21, 2005
An Ontario teenage girl's teddy bear turns vicious, and starts turning her friends into doll replicas.
51	11	"Night of the Scarecrow"	Jeffrey Alan Schechter	Scarecrow	November 1, 2005
Martin, Diana, and Java visit Martin's aunt but discover the farmland's secret. It seems that a previous French owner used a talisman to make his farmland his own for good. Up to now, the scarecrow in Martin's aunt's garden, starts to literally scare the life out of anything that is trespassing.
52	12	"The House of Zombies"	Richard Clark	Spirit of the House Builder	November 3, 2005
When Martin, Diana, Java, and Billy go with M.O.M. on a six-day corporate retreat, a bad storm comes up and they are forced to take shelter in a creepy old abandoned house. What they do not know is that the man who built the house is a spurned lover who still has not left ... and does not want to let them leave. Note: The plot of this episode is based on The Evil Dead.
53	13	"Rise of the Secret Society"	Simon Racioppa & Richard Elliott	Labyrinth Creature	December 1, 2005
Martin and schoolmate Jared are chosen to join The Bones, a secret society where membership includes cool powers like telekinesis, and free stuff like extra dessert, and sports cars. Both are thrilled until they find what awaits them with the "entrance test".
54	14	"Day of the Shadows - Part 1"	Ben Joseph & Franklin Young	Shadow Creatures	January 2, 2006
Martin, Diana, and Billy are confused when they wake one day to find themselves the only ones on campus ... and what appears to be the world. They soon meet Kaitlin, another confused person who turns out to be almost like Martin's kindred spirit. They find Billy after Diana disappears into a black hole, and discover that people's own shadows are attacking them, and dragging them into a strange shadow world.
55	15	"Day of the Shadows - Part 2"	Ben Joseph & Franklin Young	Barok the Faceless One; Shadow Creatures	January 9, 2006
Kaitlin has fallen victim to her shadow and, as usual, it is up to Martin and Billy to save the day. They have found out that since the people who were safe slept in the light, that is the thing that the shadow creatures fear. With the help of the Legendex, they realize that the shadow creatures' leader, Barok the Faceless One, wants to take over the Earth, but needs all the humans in his realm before he can cross over—and when he does, the gateway will close forever. When Billy is also taken, and Martin is the last being on Earth, the showdown begins.
56	16	"Return of the Djini"	Jeffrey Alan Schechter	Djini	January 16, 2006
Diana is ticked off with Martin and Kaitlin, and the Djini uses this to her advantage as she possesses her with an enchanted bracelet. The Djini is after revenge as she uses Diana to tempt Billy, Java, and Martin into her enchantment to get free.
57	17	"Tale of the Enchanted Keys"	Jeffrey Alan Schechter	Creatures of the Enchanted Keys (Giant Bees; Mad Marionette; Zombie Poodle Dog; Malevolent Killer Clown, Giant Tree Monster)	January 22, 2006
Famous writer Evan Prince gives Martin a typewriter without telling him that the stories Martin writes will actually come to life.
58	18	"All I Want for X-Mas"	Rob Hoegee	Jingle Jim/Mij Elgnij the Evil Elf	January 29, 2006
Martin and Diana are stuck at school for Christmas until M.O.M. invites them to the Center's Christmas party. All goes well until an evil elf appears, intent on ruining everyone's Christmas by twisting their Christmas wishes.
59	19	"Lovespell from the Underworld"	Ben Joseph & Franklin Young	Vivian Michelle/Venoso	February 6, 2006
Martin is reunited with his first crush, Vivian Michelle, who embarrassed him during grade school times. Martin tries to avoid her, but when he finds out that Vivian has changed, he changes his mind about her. Diana suspects that Vivian is different due to her strange skin. Vivian is actually Venoso, a mutated chameleon, who was the first monster Martin ever caught, out for revenge.
60	20	"Journey into Terrorland"	Rhonda Smiley	Egyptian Scarab Spirit	February 13, 2006
M.O.M, Java, Billy, and Diana decide to take Martin to an amusement park for his one-year investigator reunion, but when Billy goes missing, the gang decides to look for him. M.O.M. and Java are turned into zombies, and Diana is turned into a two-headed sea serpent. Martin soon learns that the park is being haunted by an Egyptian spirit.
61	21	"Curse of the Six-String Serenade"	Nicole Demerse	Love Monsters	February 20, 2006
Martin, Billy, and Java start their own band to attract girls, but Martin finds out that his new electric guitar is enchanted and transforms his girl fans into love monsters.
62	22	"Wrath of the Venus Flytrap"	Simon Racioppa & Richard Elliott	Mutant Venus Flytrap	February 27, 2006
A student's plant experiment for the science fair goes awry and the plant starts to eat the competition—and anything else that gets in its way.
63	23	"Pirates of Doom"	Jeff Biederman	Captain Blood; Zombie Pirates	March 6, 2006
Martin goes on a school field trip to a museum where there is an exhibition about pirates. He decides to see where the things, said to have supernatural powers, belonging to an old pirate are located. Taking a medallion with him, Martin, or more like "Captain Blood," puts Java and his teacher under his spell, and is out to find the treasure that can raise the spirits of fallen pirates.
64	24	"Rage of the Leprechaun"	Scott Kraft	Lug Leprechaun	March 13, 2006
Marvin escapes from an angry leprechaun and calls Martin and Diana for help. It turns out that he was keeping a mystic, four-leaf clover that grants the holder limitless good luck. and that leprechaun wants to take it back.
65	25	"It's Alive - Part 1"	Simon Racioppa & Richard Elliott	Octavia Paine	March 20, 2006
Diana resigns from the center for not being given a good evaluation and joins a rival paranormal organization called the CIHL (presented to her as the Creative Institute for Higher Learning - a cover-up name). Unbeknownst to her, there is an ulterior motive behind their invitation. Now armed with CIHL gear, she starts stealing Martin's monster caches.
66	26	"It's Alive - Part 2"	Simon Racioppa & Richard Elliott	Octavia Paine, Ultimate Monster	March 27, 2006
Diana learns that CIHL actually stands for "Creature Intelligence Hybrid Laboratory" and starts to fight against it. However, she is overpowered by monsters who were once Octavia Paine's agents (Octavia Paine just used her). She was turned into a half-lizard, half-girl hybrid by Octavia Paine, a former Center agent, who also did not get a good evaluation. Then Octavia creates the "Ultimate monster" from the stolen monsters and sends it to get revenge on M.O.M. Martin and Diana work as a team to defeat it. In the end, Diana gets an upgraded evaluation, while Martin gets a downgraded evaluation. The Center welcomes Diana back, but M.O.M. also gets a downgraded evaluation and Billy becomes the new head of the Center.

=== Totally Spies! crossover (2007) ===
No. overall	No. in season	Title	Written by	Enemy	Original release date
67	1	"Totally Mystery Much?"	Rhonda Smiley	The Yeti Lord a.k.a. Park Ranger, Yetis	May 13, 2007
Scientists make an amazing discovery in the Antarctic — a Yeti frozen in a block of ice! Jerry informs Sam, Clover, and Alex that there have been reports of a strange being terrorizing a posh ski resort. When they arrive to investigate the luxurious place, they find that they are not the only ones on the case—they meet Martin Mystery, and start to collaborate. In the b-story, Clover is annoyed because geeks develop a crush on her, Martin discovers Sam is similar to Diana, and Alex falls for Martin.: Notes: This is a crossover between "Totally Spies!" and "Martin Mystery", although it's more of a "Totally Spies!" episode. Diana, Java, and Billy are absent in this episode.; Notes: The events of the crossover take place during the fifth season of Totally Spies!.
