= List of Totally Spies! episodes =

The animated television series Totally Spies! follows the adventures of three Beverly Hills teenage girls—Clover, Sam, and Alex—who work as secret agents on missions to save the world, involving real locations and some fictional ones. The series comprises seven seasons divided into 182 episodes. Framing each episode is a side story in which the girls deal with high school life and its situations. Most of the episodes are self-contained. In season 3, also titled Totally Spies! Undercover, the three girls share a villa, and at the end of that season, they are promoted to super spies in the organization and are referred to as such for season 4. Season 5 follows the girls' adventures as they continue onto university.

Totally Spies! premiered on November 3, 2001, on Fox Family (subsequently known as ABC Family, now called Freeform). It later premiered in Europe on channels such as Germany's ProSieben, France's TF1 and the United Kingdom's Channel 4 during the spring of 2002. The show was moved to Cartoon Network on July 7, 2003, where it enjoyed much success, and continued airing for a total of five seasons until 2009. It spawned a feature film Totally Spies! The Movie and a spin-off series The Amazing Spiez!.

In 2013, the show was revived for a sixth season, premiering at an event at the Palace of Versailles. Twenty-six episodes were broadcast on French television and networks across Europe starting on 4 September 2013. In Canada, the sixth season premiered on September 7, 2014, on Teletoon, and on September 6 on sister station Télétoon. The show has been broadcast worldwide on various networks, including TF1 in France, Teletoon in Canada, Cartoon Network in the US and Latin America, Network 10 in Australia, Rede Globo in Brazil, Disney Channel and Nickelodeon in Asia, Africa, and Europe (formerly Fox Kids and Jetix).The head writers for the show were Robert and Michelle Lamoreaux who were based in Los Angeles, and who had worked on Nickelodeon shows. The theme song for the first two seasons is "Here We Go" by Moonbaby (Miranda Cooper and Brian Higgins), but with lyrics changed slightly to fit the show. Seasons 3–5 use the same song but as instrumentals. During the closing credits of seasons 3–4, one of the girls, or occasionally Jerry or Mandy, talks directly to the camera about random topics which sometimes are tied to the episode theme. The sixth season uses a different theme song.

The seventh season premiered on May 12, 2024. The theme song is "Top Secret Mission", sung by Mila Branger.

On 13 June 2024, it was announced that the show has been renewed for an eighth season and premiered in August 26, 2026, in France.

== Series overview ==
Season	Episodes	Air date		Channel
Season	Episodes	First aired	Last aired	Channel
1	26	(United States) November 3, 2001 (France) April 3, 2002 (Canada) September 2, 2002	(United States) June 15, 2002 (Canada) December 6, 2002	(United States) ABC Family (France) TF1 (Canada) Teletoon
2	26	(Canada) April 7, 2003 (United States) August 8, 2003	(Canada) July 6, 2003 (United States) September 19, 2004	(Canada) Teletoon (United States) Cartoon Network (France) TF1
3	26	(Canada) September 12, 2004 (United States) October 3, 2004	(Canada) May 25, 2005 (United States) July 31, 2005	(Canada) Teletoon (United States) Cartoon Network (France) TF1
4	26	(Canada) March 13, 2006 (United States) April 3, 2006	(Canada) February 5, 2007 (United States) March 8, 2007	(Canada) Teletoon (United States) Cartoon Network (France) TF1
5	26	(Canada) August 31, 2007 (United States) April 26, 2010	(Canada) March 19, 2008 (United States) June 1, 2010	(Canada) Teletoon (United States) Cartoon Network (France) TF1
Film		(France) July 22, 2009 (United States) April 25, 2010		(France) Mars Films (United States) Cartoon Network
6	26	(France) June 19, 2013 (Canada) September 7, 2014 (United States) April 10, 2020	(France) October 3, 2013 (Note: The season 6 end date of October 3, 2013, does not include the final two episodes which previously aired as part of a special event in June 2013.) (Canada) March 1, 2015 (United States) April 19, 2020	(France) TF1 (Canada) Teletoon (United States) Universal Kids
7	26	(France) May 12, 2024 (United States) January 4, 2025	(France) November 15, 2025 (United States) September 26, 2026	(France) Gulli (United States) Cartoon Network
8	26	(France) August 26, 2026 (United States) TBA	(France) TBA (United States) TBA	(France) Gulli (United States) Cartoon Network

== Episodes ==
=== Season 1 (2001) ===
No. overall	No. in season	English Title French Title	Written by	Original release date (United States)	Canadian air date	Prod. code
1	1	"A Thing for Musicians" "On connaît la musique"	Robert Lamoreaux & Michelle Lamoreaux	November 3, 2001	September 2, 2002	001
Musician Ricky Mathis becomes an overnight sensation thanks to his song "Rock Legend." When his music causes his fans to become obsessive and destructive, three young girls named Sam, Alex, and Clover are called in to investigate the cause of this fanatical behaviour under the guise of a supporting band. While Clover is enchanted by Ricky's music, Sam and Alex investigate the recording studio and discover they are using special glowing CDs that brainwash listeners. They must stop manager Sebastian Saga from using Ricky's music to take over the world. In the subplot, Clover has a crush on schoolmate Damon Reynolds, who plays guitar and hangs out with school diva and rival Mandy.
2	2	"Queen for a Day" "Reine d'un jour"	Robert Lamoreaux & Michelle Lamoreaux	February 9, 2002	September 3, 2002	002
The girls go to the African nation of Lyrobia to protect the queen Tassara after a strange kidnapping attempt. Tassara is planning to sign a peace treaty with the king of Kenyopia at Geneva. Clover goes undercover as the queen at a party, but is kidnapped in her place. Sam, Alex and Tassara follow her trail, discovering that the person behind the plot is actually the queen's younger sister Makeda, who plans to escalate the war so that she can be queen of both countries. In the subplot, Clover and Mandy campaign to be homecoming queen, but due to the mission, Clover enlists of the help of nerd Arnold Jackson, who agrees on the condition that she be his girlfriend for 24 hours if she wins.
3	3	"The New Jerry" "Le Nouveau Jerry"	Robert Lamoreaux & Michelle Lamoreaux	November 4, 2001	September 4, 2002	003
Fed up of Jerry’s butting in to their personal lives and treating them like children, the girls are happy to see the young Mac Smit takes over as the head of WOOHP. Their happiness is short-lived when Mac's generous gifts turn out to be death traps. The girls discover that Mac is actually a criminal and former employee named Tim Scam (Mac Smit is Tim's name spelled backwards), who has sent Jerry into orbit and who plans to use his inventions to vaporize the world's oceans as revenge for being fired from WOOHP.
4	4	"Get Away" "Vacances de choc !"	Doug Molitor	November 10, 2001	September 5, 2002	004
The girls return from an intense mission, but mess up in the subsequent school track and field meet. Jerry sends them to Hawaii to relax. Alex falls for a surfer guy named Corey, who is a research student for a volcano expert who has gone missing. After some surfing, Corey suddenly vanishes in a pile of dust, so the girls visit Iceland to consult with the scientist there. Returning to Hawaii, the girls discover that a madman called Hephaestus, a scientist whose face was disfigured by volcanic magma, is planning to make the volcanoes of the world erupt simultaneously. After failing to stop the lava in time, the girls soon learn the entire situation is just a W.O.O.H.P field test (Hephaestus is Jerry in disguise, while Corey is just a pimply guy named Morey), but they soon get pulled into a real emergency when the volcano erupts for real. The girls return in time for the school dance, but its theme is a Hawaiian luau with volcanoes.
5	5	"The Eraser" "Alerte au Blob !"	Steven Banks	December 8, 2001	September 6, 2002	005
The girls are summoned to investigate strange blob-like creatures that have erased the memories of select top scientists in Bora Bora. During a chase, Sam is hit by a blob as well, wiping her memory clean and rendering her useless, much to Clover and Alex's dismay. To make things worse, Clover and Alex also have to deal with Mandy, who thinks that Sam is her best friend after Sam had saved her hair from getting trapped in a pottery wheel.
6	6	"Model Citizens" "Top Modèles… de Choc !"	Robert Lamoreaux & Michelle Lamoreaux	January 12, 2002	September 13, 2002	006
When several models are kidnapped around the world, Jerry sends the spies to New York Fashion Week to investigate the possible cause. While in the Big Apple, Clover gets kidnapped, forcing Sam and Alex to rescue her. After their attempt fails, they learn that ex-model Tuesday Tate has planned to create an army of perfect models by combining various body parts of models, including Sam, Clover and Alex. Now it is up to the spies to stop Tuesday and save the modeling industry, and get back Clover's legs, Sam's teeth and Alex's hair. In the subplot, Clover tries to win a beauty pageant for a food court.
7	7	"The Fugitives" "Les Fugitives"	Robert Lamoreaux & Michelle Lamoreaux	December 15, 2001	September 12, 2002	007
Sam, Clover and Alex fight to save their spy careers after being framed of committing a bank robbery in Phoenix. Forced to evade Jerry and the full force of the WOOHP agency, the spies investigate as they try to clear their names and soon discover that a villain from their past has managed to create exact copies of the spies themselves and plans to have his army of doppelgangers and clones rob hundreds of banks around the world, at the exact moment. In the subplot, Clover tries to impress a transfer student from Texas by wearing a cowgirl outfit only for Mandy to beat her to the punch.
8	8	"Abductions" "Enlèvements"	David Michel & Vincent Chalvon-Demersay	January 5, 2002	September 10, 2002	008
Sam, Clover and Alex are sent undercover as sophisticated scholars to investigate the kidnappings of Nobel Prize winners at a conference in Paris. They soon discover strange connection that the people being kidnapped are experts on the subjects of the quizzes about to be given back in Beverly Hills. The kidnapper, a concerned parent and ambassador, has stolen the prize winners' intelligence and transmitted it into his son to make him the smartest child in the world. In the subplot, Sam inadvertently lands the female lead in the school production of Les Misérables causing conflict with a jealous Clover, and infighting throughout the episode.
9	9	"Child's Play" "Un jeu d'enfant"	Rhonda Smiley	December 1, 2001	September 11, 2002	009
When vital members of society start becoming engrossed in old-fashioned toys, the girls get sent to a toy fair in Taiwan. During the fair Sam gets affected, acting like a whiny child half her age, and soon after Jerry and all the WOOHP agents follow. Clover and Alex soon discover that Vladimir Kozirev, a toymaker from the 1970s, plans to make all adults of the world act like children to bring back his favorite doll, the "Little Ann". In the subplot, Clover tries to impress a senior named Rick by acting more mature by wearing business-women clothes.
10	10	"Silicon Valley Girls" "Les Espionnes de la Silicon Valley"	Doug Molitor	January 26, 2002	September 17, 2002	010
The girls go on a mission to discover why machines are attacking three seemingly random people. The attacks turn out to be related, leading to Sam, Clover and Alex going undercover as exchange students at the high-tech Silicon Valley High school. There, they find out that the attacks are the work of a sentient and autonomous artificial intelligence/multi-agent system named C.H.A.D., the invention of a boy named Adam Lewis, who was bullied at all of his different schools. Though Adam only wanted to use C.H.A.D for harmless pranks, C.H.A.D instead harmed Adam's old enemies and now plans to fire nuclear missiles at all of Adam's old schools. In the subplot, Mandy becomes the student court judge and puts the girls on trash duty for minor dress-code infringements.
11	11	"Spy Gladiators" "L'Île des Gladiateurs"	Robert Lamoreaux & Michelle Lamoreaux	January 19, 2002	September 16, 2002	011
The girls go undercover on a popular game show F.I.G.H.T. (Fear Intimidation Gladiator Habitat) to discover why the famous Olympic decathlete Reggie Willis and several other competitors have gone missing after losing on the show. It turns out that the host Vince King has been enslaving the contestants using mind-controlling electronic collars to make them into new gladiators, ensuring that no one will ever win. During their time as contestants, the girls became crowd favorites, but Vince turns Sam into a gladiator, pitting her against Alex. Clover and a freed Reggie Willis rally together and attempt to pull the plug and end the show once and for all. In the subplot, Alex tries to befriend tough new girl Donna Ramone, but her interactions anger Donna to the point that Donna calls her out for a beating after school.
12	12	"Shrinking" "Modèles Réduits"	Jillian Tohber	March 2, 2002	September 19, 2002	012
When various landmarks seem to literally vanish, the spies follow the trail in order to stop these anomalies. While trying to save the Great Wall of China, the girls discover that ex-WOOHP scientist Diminutive Smalls and his siblings are behind the thefts. However, Clover gets shrunk in the process and gives the villains a new idea. In the subplot, Clover searches for the perfect outfit to wear to impress her date Jason Roberts, but her shrinking leads to serious problems.
13	13	"Aliens" "L'Invasion des Extra-Terrestres"	Adam Beechen	March 9, 2002	September 20, 2002	013
The girls are called in when random people from different nations are abducted by what looks like aliens. During excursions to Saudi Arabia and Mexico, they soon learn of the strange group called GOOPER and lead to Alex being abducted. Sam and Clover learn that the evil Sage Hawking has captured a peaceful group of extraterrestrials in order to extort every world government for massive wealth. In the subplot, Alex prepares for her Driver's Ed test.
14	14	"Man or Machine" "Les Robots Attaquent"	Jordana Arkin	June 15, 2002	December 4, 2002	014
The spies are sent on a mission to observe the strange behaviors of world leaders when they suddenly begin to build thrill rides in their countries' landmarks. The girls learn that Dr. Eisenstein has replaced himself and the world leaders with robots to turn the world into a giant theme park. In the subplot, Alex and Clover accuse Sam of being too serious and no fun.
15	15	"Wild Style" "L'Île Sauvage"	Robert Lamoreaux & Michelle Lamoreaux	March 16, 2002	September 23, 2002	015
Jerry sends the girls to investigate the disappearance of the cruise ship Juliet and its 200 passengers. When the spies land on an uncharted island full of strange animal-human hybrids, things only get worse as Clover becomes affected and turned into a catgirl. The girls learn that formerly famous fashion designer Helga von Guggen has a plan to turn the captured passengers into hybrids and kill them all to make the world's first collection of seamless fur coats. In the subplot, Clover buys rubber platform shoes to impress the star of the Beverly High basketball team.
16	16	"The Black Widows" "Les Veuves Noires"	Robert Lamoreaux & Michelle Lamoreaux	March 23, 2002	September 24, 2002	016
Jerry brings the girls in to investigate the kidnapping of the Honeybees, the ten-year running national cheerleading champions. While at the nationals, the girls find an unusual group known as the Black Widows, whose routine is identical to the missing Honeybees. When the girls learn that Candy Sweet, a former military robotics engineer who failed her Honeybee cheerleader tryouts in her high school days has built the Black Widows as a revenge scheme, it's up to the spies to stop them from killing everyone at the world cheerleading championship. In the subplot, Mandy competes with Sam at a spelling bee, even employing some top scholars, but she gets stage fright at the competition.
17	17	"Passion Patties" "Cookies Délices"	Robin Riordan	May 11, 2002	September 18, 2002	017
The spies investigate Passion Patties, a new brand of cookies sold by the Happy Girl Scouts that causes people to get hooked on it and become obese. Clover herself falls victim to the cookies, slowly becoming fatter as the episode progresses. The girls discover that the villain is a disgruntled cookie maker, who captures them and subjects them to a feeding machine that force feeds them cookies in order to fatten them up to massive proportions. The girls escape and track the cookie maker to her base. Clover's massive figure proves to be very useful, as she ends up growing much larger than the enemy henchmen, allowing her to easily crush them under her greatly increased weight. In the end, the spies manage to turn the tables on the cookie maker by literally giving her a taste of her own medicine. A cure is found for the cookie addiction, much to the relief of Clover. In the subplot, Clover gets upset that she is sized as a large for a new hat.
18	18	"Stuck in the Middle Ages with You" "Amour, Espionnes et Moyen-Âge"	Holly Henderson & Liz Tigelaar	November 17, 2001	September 9, 2002	018
The girls are sent to investigate the kidnappings of various military personnel and scientists by a mysterious knight. When they end up in the middle of another kidnapping, they follow the criminal through a strange portal, transporting them back to medieval England in the year 1136, 865 years ago. The knight reveals himself as a Malibu teen who wants to overthrow the benevolent king by using his modern technology, and takes Clover as his queen. It is up to Sam and Alex to stop him before the timeline is forever changed. In the subplot, the girls compete against Mandy for the best costume at the annual Halloween dance.: The title is a parody of the 1973 song "Stuck in the Middle with You" by Stealers Wheel.
19	19	"Evil Boyfriend" "Le Petit Ami de Sam"	Robert Lamoreaux & Michelle Lamoreaux	April 6, 2002	September 25, 2002	019
While the girls investigate who tried to steal a top-secret invisibility formula from a military base, Sam falls for James, an exchange student from London. While the other girls are happy for her at first, she quickly begins to spend all her time with him and seems to forget their friendship. Clover and Alex soon learn that James is the thief, and catch him and Sam stealing the formula. James soon reveals that he was simply using Sam to steal the formula to become the world's greatest criminal. Now it is up to Clover, Alex and a heartbroken Sam to stop him from kidnapping the President of the United States. In the subplot, the girls try to spend some quality—not spy-related—time together.
20	20	"Game Girls" "Jeux Dangereux"	Bryan Thompson	April 20, 2002	September 26, 2002	020
Sam, Clover and Alex are called in to investigate how famous athletes are seemingly vanishing. While trying to save a famous racecar driver, a mysterious motorcycle rider arrives, kidnapping the driver Dale along with Alex. Sam and Clover soon meet the former video game creator Carla Wong, and quickly learn of her plan to use the kidnapped athletes (who have actually been converted into data), multiply them and launch a new line of games. In the subplot, Alex's new celebrity crush turns out to be computer animated.
21	21	"Ice Man Cometh" "Retour à l'Ère Glaciaire"	Jeny Quine	June 8, 2002	December 6, 2002	021
The world starts to experience extremely cold weather and Jerry sends the spies to uncover the source. When the weather starts to turn even worse, the girls find that the evil Dr. Gelee plans to freeze the Earth's core to wipe out humanity and all of the environmental damage with them. Not only that, he kidnaps Clover to stay with him as a prisoner. In the subplot, when Clover turns down a geek, she gets labeled an Ice Queen.
22	22	"Spy vs. Spy" "Double Jeu"	Robert Lamoreaux & Michelle Lamoreaux	March 30, 2002	September 27, 2002	022
When Jerry sends the girls to investigate the destruction of power plants around the globe, the girls are saved by Pam, Alice and Crimson, three former WOOHP spies who were thought to be dead for seven years. While on a mission to save a hydroelectric plant, the elder spies do nothing to save Sam, Alex and Clover from a watery grave. The girls survive and soon learn that the older spies are under the control of evil mastermind Edison, who plans to extort the world for the exclusive use of solar power. In the subplot, Clover meets Robbie Guthrie, a schoolmate who used to prank her a lot in elementary school, and plans to use her date to get revenge, but ponders whether he has changed his bullying ways.: The title is a parody of the Mad Magazine comic Spy vs Spy by Antonio Prohias.
23	23	"Do You Believe in Magic?" "Vous Croyez à la Magie ?"	Scott Gorden	June 1, 2002	September 30, 2002	023
When extremely valuable art seems to literally "disappear", the spies are sent in to stop the thief. The journey leads to Alex vanishing along with the art. In the subplot, the girls' entry for a photography competition is ruined by Mandy's opening the darkroom door.
24	24	"Soul Collector" "La Fontaine de Jouvence"	Mark Valenti	May 18, 2002	December 3, 2002	024
Several students are discovered to have been mysteriously drained of their youth. They retain youthful, albeit slightly wizened bodies, but have the chemical composition and actions of octogenarians. The girls investigate and come across the principal's diary which he has kept since the 13th century, thus learning that the school's principal is in fact a centenarian. He has maintained his youthful physique by absorbing the youth of his juvenile fellows to keep himself immortal. When he chooses Alex as his next victim, Sam and Clover are obliged to collaborate in order to stop him and his accomplices from gaining immortality. In the subplot, Sam freaks out when Mandy points out a gray streak in her hair.
25	25	"Malled" "À Bas les Clients !"	Joe Purdy	May 25, 2002	December 2, 2002	025
Sam, Alex and Clover investigate why stores are abducting people around the world. They travel to Australia and find a villain bent on getting rid of all the malls by building an army of men and women programmed to hate and destroy malls but when Sam is kidnapped and later brainwashed into becoming one of the attackers, it falls to Clover and Alex to stop the villain once and for all and rescue Sam. In the subplot, Clover gets framed for shoplifting thanks to Mandy.
26	26	"A Spy Is Born – Part 1" "Une Espionne est Née – Partie 1"	Robert Lamoreaux & Michelle Lamoreaux	May 4, 2002	December 5, 2002	026
The spies are called in when the two highest-grossing actors in Hollywood are kidnapped in broad daylight. While undercover to protect the 3rd-highest-grossing celebrity, the culprit somehow manages to sneak away with an old camera as the girls' only clue. That night, Alex goes undercover as the 4th-highest-grossing actress, she is kidnapped and Sam and Clover are instantly frozen. Jerry unfreezes them and reveals that the kidnapper is a wannabe movie director named Marco Lumière and follows Alex's com-powder to a remote island. On the island, Lumière reveals his plot to create his own movie masterpiece using the kidnapped actors and actresses by putting them through deadly traps and "special effects", all of them real. Sam, Clover and Alex, however quickly save the stars and capture Lumière with his own trick. Although the mission is successful, Lumière unfreezes and escapes into the ocean. The next morning, Alex does not show up at school, with Sam and Clover receiving a message from Alex who has been kidnapped by Lumière and is now held hostage. In the subplot, Sam was voted "Most Popular Student" in the yearbook, and becomes a school celebrity.: The story is concluded in "A Spy Is Born – Part 2" from the second season.

=== Season 2 (2002) ===
No. overall	No. in season	English Title French Title	Written by	Original release date (Canada)	United States air date	Prod. code
27	1	"A Spy Is Born – Part 2" "Une Espionne Est Née – Partie 2"	Michelle Lamoreaux & Robert Lamoreaux	April 7, 2003	September 19, 2004	027
Psychopathic director Lumiere has kidnapped Alex and forces Sam and Clover to endure a series of deadly riddles and traps. In the subplot, Sam learns that her secret admirer's initials are A.J., only to discover him to be Arnold Jackson, the school nerd.: Notes: This is Part 2 of the two-part Season 1 episode.
28	2	"I Want My Mummy" "Ma Meilleure Momie"	Bryan Thompson	April 8, 2003	August 13, 2003	028
An archaeologist fakes his disappearance, then plots to use ancient magic to give himself eternal life and power. The spies, with the help of the professor's assistant, must stop him. In the subplot, Clover accidentally ends up with Mandy's ring and ponders when she can return it.
29	3	"Evil Hair Salon" "Le Salon De Coiffure Maléfique"	Joseph Purdy	June 9, 2003	August 14, 2003	029
Redheads start vanishing worldwide after visiting the new Cutting Edge Hair Salons. Sam has Clover and Alex dress up as redheads to investigate the salon, but they are turned down. However, Clover is invited back as her blonde hair attracts the shop owner's assistants. Inside, Clover is kidnapped and taken to a place where the abducted women have been forced to grow their hair to be harvested. In the subplot, the girls plan a surprise party for Jerry.
30	4	"The Yuck Factor" "Dans la peau de Jerry"	David Slack	April 10, 2003	August 15, 2003	030
Noting that Jerry is acting very strangely, the spies discover that an evil scientist named Dr. V has taken over Jerry's brain. Dr. V is microscopic in size, so the girls get into a vehicle and shrink themselves to micro-size to search for the doctor inside Jerry's body before he uses Jerry to take over WOOHP and the world. In the subplot, Alex tries to evade having to dissect a live frog.
31	5	"It's How You Play the Game" "La Règle Du Jeu"	Rhonda Smiley	April 11, 2003	August 18, 2003	031
The nation of Zanzibar has been winning a number of events in the Winter Olympics despite hardly training. The spies go undercover as reporters where they discover that the team's coach has developed metal bugs that implant into the athlete's bodies, giving them amazing talent, and is using them to make up for his own Olympic failures. When the spies try to stop him, Clover is captured and bugged. In the subplot, the girls become infatuated with a classmate named David and compete for his affection.
32	6	"Here Comes the Sun" "Espionnes Au Soleil"	Jordana Arkin	April 13, 2003	August 19, 2003	032
Sudden spikes in global warming and ozone holes start occurring at the same time that a new suntan lotion labeled "Sun Block SPF 10,000" goes on sale. The girls try to find the culprit fast since the Earth is getting hotter and hotter by the minute. In the subplot, Clover wants David to choose her as his painting model.
33	7	"Green with N.V." "Un Parfum Diabolique"	Holly Henderson & Liz Tigelaar	April 14, 2003	August 20, 2003	033
The girls are entangled with a mission when they learn a new cologne, designed by Natalie Valentine, is causing men to go wild in search of their "true love". The spies go undercover as men and figure out how NV makes her perfume. In the subplot, the girls bicker over who gets to invite David to the dance, only to discover to their horror that he eventually chooses Mandy.
34	8	"Boys Bands Will Be Boys Bands" "Le Boys Band Fou"	Mitch Watson	April 15, 2003	August 21, 2003	034
The Spies investigate the hottest new pop band, Teensicle, when one of the band members mysteriously disappears. When he resurfaces seemingly safe and sound, the spies detect strange changes in his personality and talent. It turns out a group of washed up pop stars named Boy Candy are stealing the current pop stars' faces in order to revive their has-been careers. Also when Alex makes a snide remark about the band's mother, they swap her face for the red-haired smoking woman while she gets Alex's face. In the subplot, Alex ponders whether to get a tattoo in order to look more cool after Mandy brags about hers.
35	9	"I Dude" "Surf d'Enfer"	Jen Klein & Michael Stokes	April 16, 2003	August 22, 2003	035
When tsunamis begin to trash beach-side resorts, the spies are sent to Australia to investigate. It turns out that Frankie Dude, an evil surfer who lost his pinky toe and career thanks to a new pier, has been cutting down glaciers and sending large waves to the five biggest surf spots in the world with the last one having the possibility of destroying their beloved Beverly Hills. In the subplot, Sam and David go on a hunger strike to protest the firing of their lunch lady to an automated machine.
36	10	"Mommies Dearest" "Très Chères Mamans"	Michelle Lamoreaux & Robert Lamoreaux	April 9, 2003	August 25, 2003	036
Looking for Mother's Day gifts for their mothers, Clover, Sam and Alex find a flier about a special offer at a spa. But after they get there, they notice that their mothers are not behaving normally when they make ruthless attempts to do them in. They find out that their nemesis Tim Scam has escaped from prison and has turned their mothers into cold-blooded assassins and plans to abduct them. In the subplot, Jerry spends Mother's Day at his overbearing mother's in England.
37	11	"Zooney World" "Zooneyland"	Wendell Morris	June 17, 2003	August 26, 2003	037
Clover's little cousin Norman is an avid fan of "Zooney", a television show which has become a favorite among children. When some of the children have been reported missing, Jerry sends Sam, Alex and Clover to track them down, but before they can launch into their mission, Sam and Alex must figure out how to get Clover out of being grounded.
38	12	"First Brat" "La Fille Du Président"	Scott Gorden	June 18, 2003	September 24, 2003	038
Jerry is invited to go fishing with the President, while the girls are charged with taking care of the President's 11-year-old daughter, Madison, who proves to be quite troublesome. But when Madison is kidnapped, the girls must find a way to get her back without making it a national crisis.
39	13	"W.O.W." "Catch !"	Bobby Gaylor	April 21, 2003	April 19, 2004	039
Seemingly ordinary women across America keep going berserk and attacking both men and unaffected women. All of the berserkers turn out to be descendants of the Sisterhood, a guild of warrior women who intended to wipe out all men and inferior women. They failed but one of the descendants named Ariel has been reviving the idea using their descendants and Sam falls prey to her magic. In the subplot, Clover learns of a secret club, and insists on joining, only to discover at the end of the episode that is a fan club for Mandy.
40	14	"Stark Raving Mad" "Rave Academy"	Holly Huckins	April 22, 2003	April 20, 2004	040
Sebastian escapes from prison and he plans to use his music to hypnotize peoples to demolish the spies' favorite places. When the girls discover that Sebastian is the villain behind this, he hypnotizes the girls to help with demolishing Beverly High School. Luckily, Jerry rescues the girls and then they stop Sebastian by destroying his music signal which was hidden in the school's sign. In the subplot, Alex gets worried that she may get bad luck for breaking a mirror.
41	15	"Starstruck" "Totally Stars"	David Slack	April 23, 2003	August 8, 2003	041
When a famous TV star from the soap opera "Days of Our Spies" goes missing, the spies beg Jerry to let them carry on the investigations. A seemingly insane old woman named Lenore von Schram mistakes the TV show for reality and plans on murdering Sinestro, the villain on the show, and Clover, who played Sinestro's daughter, Gwendolyn. Moreover, Lenore intends to marry the TV show hero.
42	16	"S.P.I." "S.P.I."	Bryan Thompson	April 24, 2003	April 21, 2004	042
A new spy agency called S.P.I. (Super Protection International) gains popularity and runs WOOHP out of business. But Sam does not feel like abandoning her spy career easily, and investigates inside S.P.I. But then she gets captured by the S.P.I. agents themselves. In the subplot, Alex and Clover apply for part-time jobs at Chic Boutique.
43	17	"Animal World" "Créatures Féroces"	Michael Kramer	April 27, 2003	April 22, 2004	043
Animals at the Beijing Zoo start developing human intelligence and anthropomorphic features while humans regress into a state of animalistic retardation. The Spies ponder over how to thwart the scheme hatched by a mad scientist named Dr. Fox who has been mixing human and animal DNA. Clover falls prey to his undertaking, becoming part beagle. In the subplot, Clover must choose between joining David on a study date or attending the W.O.O.H.P. company picnic.: This is the second time that Clover is fused with animal DNA; the first was in Episode 15 "Wild Style" when she was injected with feline DNA.
44	18	"Nature Nightmare" "Camping Sauvage"	Mitch Watson	June 19, 2003	April 23, 2004	044
The Spies go camping in a remote Saskatchewan forest in order to investigate a garbled but alarming message from a TV news crew who vanished while looking into reports of the disappearance of dozens of loggers, farmers, and hikers in the area. While one reporter was trapped in a cocoon and also been put in a coma thanks to the rescue by Sam. The girls learn that the evil scientist Lasputin Zero has created plants with intelligence in order to protect themselves from humanity, but his creations soon run out of control and plan to attack innocent people. In the subplot, Clover tries to show David that she too can be extreme at outdoor activities.
45	19	"Alex Quits" "Alex Démissionne"	Rhonda Smiley	April 18, 2003	April 26, 2004	045
When Alex messes up on several WOOHP missions, she begins to seriously doubt her usefulness to the team. Then, when Jerry introduces the girls to Britney—a beautiful, smart, and sweet spy-in-training who has been assigned to help them on their next mission—Alex only feels worse. In fact, she thinks that she is on the verge of being replaced. When she messes up again and lets a villain named Willard (who has invented a device that literally slows people down) escape, she decides to quit WOOHP altogether. In the subplot, Alex must do an extra credit project in order to pass her science class.
46	20	"Totally Switched" "Sens Dessus Dessous"	Joseph Purdy	June 20, 2003	April 27, 2004	046
Well-known people in England have been making headlines after completely changing their personalities and interests. The girls investigate, but Sam and Alex mysteriously vanish. Clover calls Jerry for help, and the two figure out that the personalities of each pair of people affected have been traded by the evil Dr. Gray. However, things get even worse when Clover and Jerry's personalities are swapped – on the same night that Clover is going to guest star as a DJ (disc jockey) and Jerry is going to be knighted.
47	21	"Ski Trip" "La Classe De Neige"	Holly Henderson & Liz Tigelaar	June 22, 2003	April 28, 2004	047
A school ski trip turns into a stressful situation when the girls have to share a room with Mandy, something that even Jerry cannot fix. Each of the girls then is thrown into an accident that nearly kills them; they suspect Mandy to be the cause until Jerry informs them that an old villain Dr. Gelee has escaped from prison. Gelee kidnaps Mandy, mistaking her for Clover, leaving the girls to rescue her. In the subplot, Clover and Mandy compete for the affections of a snowboarder named Todd.
48	22	"The Elevator" "L'Ascenseur Fou"	Michelle Lamoreaux & Robert Lamoreaux	June 30, 2003	April 29, 2004	048
Clip show episode: When the girls are called away to investigate a break-in at a nearby office, the girls are lured into an elevator when the thief escapes and breaks the cables, leaving the girls on the brink of falling to their deaths. With no gadgets or working compowders, they are left to ponder their adventures so far. In the subplot, Clover has a hot movie date with a football player, managing to drag Sam and Alex along to go with his nerdy, younger brothers.
49	23	"Matchmaker" "Le Garçon Parfait"	Jen Klein & Michael Stokes	July 2, 2003	April 30, 2004	049
For absolutely no reason at all, the strange "Arrow through the Heart" dating booths appear out of nowhere and all the girls in Beverly Hills, Sam & Alex included, are addicted to their very hunky boyfriends in the process. But Clover, who put herself on a dating hiatus, suspects that something is wrong, and decides to get to the bottom of it, even without Jerry's help. Clover then learns that the heartbroken Eugene Snit has created the dating service and is multitasking as every boyfriend with an evil plan to break every girls' heart on Valentine's Day. It's up to Clover to stop him.
50	24	"Brain Drain" "Qui Veut Gagner Des Espionnes ?"	Scott Gorden	July 3, 2003	May 3, 2004	050
When Sam is on the Brain Busters Show, something mysterious happens when Sam suddenly forgets all of the answers and she loses miserably. Alex and Clover are suspicious that something is going on other than a game show. Meanwhile, Jerry attempts to run tests on Sam, but she escapes. Alex and Clover find an intelligence-sucking device in the capsules. Sam runs into the Planet Sushi, where she finds Zack and is soon occupied with the food. Jerry finally finds Sam and drives her back to WOOHP when he is called by Alex and Clover. The news they give is about the intelligence-sucking device and that they have to sneak back in to find out more. Alex and Clover find some trouble, and discover that the girl who won against Sam is working with the game show host. Soon, it goes to a game of Brain Busters while Alex and Clover are trapped in a glass tank with barely any oxygen. They manage to escape, and attempt to stop them.
51	25	"Fashion Faux Pas" "Victimes De La Mode"	David Slack	July 4, 2003	May 4, 2004	051
The girls learn that Helga von Guggen has escaped from prison and track her accomplice Trode to a secret warehouse. Inside, however, they're overjoyed when they find the designs of the anonymous designer Mystique. The only problem is that when they try the clothes on, they will not come off. Now the girls have to find a way to stop Helga before she gains her revenge on the fashion world by suffocating everyone with her new clothes. In the subplot, Sam becomes hooked on the readings of mall psychic Tyresius.
52	26	"Toying Around" "Un Joujou D'Enfer"	Michelle Lamoreaux & Robert Lamoreaux	July 6, 2003	May 5, 2004	052
A high-tech toy manufacturer uses stolen military microchips to make his action figures more realistic. The chips unintentionally cause his toys to become bent on world domination. The spies are on a mission to help this accidental baddie stop his toys and correct his mistake. In the subplot, Clover has a new boy toy who caters to her every whim.

=== Season 3 (2004) ===
Season 3 was broadcast on TF1 in France, on Teletoon in Canada, on Cartoon Network and Animania HD in the United States and otherwise internationally in 2004–2005.

No. overall	No. in season	English Title French Title	Written by	Original release date (Canada)	United States air date	Prod. code
53	1	"Physics 101 Much?" "Sans Dessus dessous"	Rhonda Smiley	September 12, 2004	October 3, 2004	053
The spies are sent to stop a launching rocket that is being held by a force field, and then to investigate several mysterious thefts of high-tech gadgetry. They discover a villain who generates force fields that cancel the effects of gravity. In the subplot, the girls move into their new villa while their parents are away on business. They argue over who gets the best bedroom. Eventually Clover wins, but she changes her mind when she discovers the room's window faces Mandy's room next door.
54	2	"Freaky Circus Much?" "Le cirque de la Peur"	Nicole Demerse	September 19, 2004	October 10, 2004	054
Jerry sends the girls to Toronto to investigate a rash of missing people reports. Sam picks up a mirror fragment but her hand changes into a lobster claw. Later they track down the circus, which has been converting people on its ride into circus freaks. Alex becomes a fish and Clover turns into an elephant. In the subplot, Clover has signed the girls up to star in a new reality television show, but Sam and Alex are concerned about invasion of privacy and the possible exposure of their secret agent lives.
55	3	"Computer Creep Much?" "Cybermaniaque"	Richard Elliot & Simon Racioppa	September 26, 2004	October 17, 2004	055
When a bunch of computer geeks have gone missing at the cyber cafes, the spy girls investigate and discover that an evil software designer has developed a virus that turns people into programming zombies. The virus transmits via cell phones and even the spies' own electronic gadgets. Clover is captured; Sam and even Jerry are brainwashed, leaving Alex to face the designer before he infects the entire world. In the subplot, an overly frugal Alex gets a job at the mall where she has to wear an embarrassing chicken suit.
56	4	"Space Much?" "La Menace de l'Espace"	Rob Hoegee	October 3, 2004	November 7, 2004	056
The spies are sent to investigate unusual meteorites around the world that have been striking various scientists. The investigations leads them to a villain in a decommissioned space station who has the technology to "throw" meteorites down to Earth. The spies have to stop her from targeting a movie star. In the subplot, the girls are given a strict nanny from WOOHP named Myrna Beesbottom.
57	5	"Morphing Is Sooo 1987" "Panique à Beverly High"	Ben Joseph & Franck Young	November 14, 2004	December 5, 2004	057
The girls are attacked by a mailman that is made of some metallic compound and can change his arms into weapons. They investigate a wig factory where they discover that Tim Scam is back. Although they capture Scam, the girls are later attacked at school by a metallic Arnold Jackson doppelganger, and then find Tim Scam has invaded WOOHP headquarters. In the subplot, Sam makes Alex and Clover clean the house.
58	6	"Evil Coffee Shop Much?" "Le Café De L'Angoisse"	Rhonda Smiley	November 7, 2004	November 14, 2004	058
The girls investigate a series of disappearances at Das Coffeehaus, but they are joined by a new WOOHP spy, Mandy. Sam comes across a bubbling coffee bath, but is captured by the owner and made an addicted coffee worker at his factory. Alex, Clover and Mandy try to rescue her.
59	7	"Forward to the Past" "Disco Spies"	John Slama	October 10, 2004	November 21, 2004	059
The girls are shocked to see a crime wave of electronics stores where the criminals get away using a mysterious orange orb. They try to report it to WOOHP, however, they discover their building is abandoned. They follow the thieves through the orb, which is actually a portal to the 1970s, and discover that Jerry has teamed up with a guy named Boogie Gus to start a different kind of WOOHP—which basically does the opposite. It is up to the spies to travel back in time and put Jerry on the right path. In the subplot, Clover pushes speed dating to a new level with her "hypersonic dating".
60	8	"Planet of the Hunks" "La Menace des Gladiateurs"	Jef Biederman	October 17, 2004	November 28, 2004	060
The spies investigate the disappearance of several high profile good-looking guys by some robot gladiators, however, they are not the kind that are subdued by magnets. They follow the operation to a private island where they discover that a rich and powerful entrepreneur's daughter has been collecting men for her personal zoo. When she tires of them, she has them executed in her arena by her robot gladiators and lions. The girls must fend off the lions and gladiators as well as a giant robot gladiator. In the subplot, when Alex and Sam are searching for their missing clothes, they end up reading Clover's diary, causing everyone to be upset throughout the mission.
61	9	"Super Nerd Much?" "Supernaze"	Richard Clark	November 28, 2004	December 19, 2004	061
Arnold comes across the Cat's Eye, an emerald ring that has the power of sucking the coolness out of people. The ring makes him extremely cool, skillful and attractive as the ring causes his muscles to grow turning him from a scrawny nerd into a big, beefy hunk. After Clover and Mandy are transformed into nerds, the girls track down Arnold, who plans to use the ring to zap all of Beverly Hills.
62	10	"The Incredible Bulk" "L'effet Musclor"	Richard Elliot & Simon Racioppa	November 21, 2004	December 12, 2004	062
Bodybuilding guys are suddenly behaving strangely, instantly growing huge muscle and destroying things around them. The girls discover that the behavior is caused by a bar product, which is created by a former Mr. Universe. In the subplot, A gym opens up the spies' neighbourhood and Alex becomes smitten with the instructor.
63	11	"Dental? More Like Mental" "Panique Chez Le Dentiste"	Nicole Demerse	December 5, 2004	March 6, 2005	063
Some high-profile people have gone missing, but the only common thread among them is that they have all gone to the same dentist Dr. Jay. As the girls investigate, Sam is captured and turned into one of the minions of Dr. Jay who has been controlling the people with special laughing gas. In two subplots, Alex struggles with a toothache and Mandy appears to be broke, but it is later revealed that she had lost her credit card privileges due to her poor grades.
64	12	"Escape from WOOHP Island" "Révolte au WOOHP"	Rhonda Smiley	December 12, 2004	March 13, 2005	064
When Britney's plane goes down on WOOHP island, the girls must rescue her and round up the prisoners before the island self-destructs in two hours. They must face three of the island's most dangerous villains: Gargantuan, the Surgeon and Alienator. In the subplot, Clover becomes a cosmetics saleswoman, selling products to Alex and Sam, but her products make their skin worse.
65	13	"Scam Camp Much?" "Le Camp des Stars"	Tim Burns	December 19, 2004	March 20, 2005	065
After several teens have been rioting and destroying things around town; Jerry has the spies infiltrate as participants at a talent camp. The girls discover that the leader of the camp has been extracting the talent from the teens in order to make herself more talented. In the subplot, the girls plan to throw a big house party but Mandy threatens to have an even bigger and more popular event next door.
66	14	"Evil G.L.A.D.I.S. Much?" "Le Noël de L'angoisse"	Rhonda Smiley	December 29, 2004	March 27, 2005	066
It is Christmas time and WOOHP is hosting its annual holiday party. Like all things WOOHP, the boredom does not last long. When a glass of punch is spilled on G.L.A.D.I.S. (Gadget Lending and Distribution Interactive System), she sizzles and sputters... then goes positively nutty and starts to take over, locking everyone inside the building and launching an all-out war against the spies and the other agents. Jerry reveals G.L.A.D.I.S.' dark secret to the spies. With the new information, the spies race to stop G.L.A.D.I.S. before it destroys WOOHP and the world. In the subplot, Mandy and Clover compete over a pair of Yves Mont Blanc boots.
67	15	"Super Agent Much?" "Super Spy"	Richard Clark	January 2, 2005	April 3, 2005	067
Sam and Alex confront Clover about slacking off during their missions. After losing track of Clover on their next mission, they find she has managed to single-handedly defeat the villain. Suddenly, Clover's beginning to act very differently. Her spy skills keep getting better and better as she begins developing superhuman strength, agility, better analytical skills, and endurance but the new skills have come at a price because Clover is becoming very aggressive and sociopathic, preferring to work by herself. When Sam and Alex investigate, they find out that Geraldine, head of rival agency S.P.I., has secretly modified and upgraded Clover into a super-enhanced spy agent so she can recruit her to become a full-time spy for her organization instead of WOOHP. In the final battle, it is Sam and Alex facing off against Clover as the two attempt to try to get their best friend back.
68	16	"Evil Airlines Much?" "Y a-t-il un maniaque dans l'avion ?"	Nicole Demerse	January 9, 2005	April 10, 2005	068
When a brand new, super-chic, super-fast airline debuts Clover is totally stoked—because she just won a contest to fly on the plane's maiden voyage. However, Sam and Alex are not happy with Clover, because she used up the stamps and did not mail Alex's or Sam's tickets into the contest drawing. Clover, along with a gaggle of international mega-celebrities, will fly from L.A. to Paris, while Sam and Alex are left to test gadgets at WOOHP. Clover learns that their pilot, Captain Hayes, is actually a demented baddie suffering from a major case of what Clover calls 'CWS' ('Celebrity Worship Syndrome'), and has decided to never land the plane so he can hang out with the celebrities forever.
69	17	"Creepy Crawly Much?" "Les Insectes Attaquent"	Ben Joseph & Franck Young	January 23, 2005	April 17, 2005	069
When secret government installations are being invaded by mysterious unseen forces, the spies are sent to investigate. It seems that bugs have been trained by someone as part of a plot to destroy the earth. The only survivors will be the insects and their half-human, half-insect king Max Exterminus (Exterminus has been injecting himself with cockroach DNA). Of course, every king needs a queen, so Max Exterminus kidnaps Alex. In a subplot, Alex feels depressed about her dating life, so she starts going out with a somber goth guy.
70	18	"Truth or Scare" "Action - Vérité"	John Slama	January 16, 2005	April 24, 2005	070
During a game of "Reality or Risk" (a variant of Truth or Dare?), Mandy asks Alex who is her best friend, but when Alex is only allowed to pick one, Sam and Clover start to get way competitive when it comes to who is Alex's BEST friend. The girls are then hired by Jackson John to find out who attempted to kidnap him. Alex ends up getting gassed with truth serum and reveals the existence of WOOHP. The person who has been using the gas is revealed to be a journalist for the gossip magazine Yes, Way, and uses this new information and Alex (and later, Jerry) to try to take over the magazine industry. Later, after Clover and Sam asked Alex who her oldest and dearest friend was when Alex was under the truth serum and she said "Ollie" Alex shows them who "Ollie" is—a stuffed turtle that Alex has had since she was 2.
71	19	"Feng Shui Is Like So Passe" "Le Gourou Fou"	Jef Biederman	January 30, 2005	May 1, 2005	071
The spies are shocked to discover that Jerry has hired a Feng Shui master, unaware that he has a delusional plan of attempting to relocate all the continents by using WOOHP technology and bring them together to create happiness and yin-yang balance which will result in the world being destroyed. In the subplot, Clover hires Terra to be her personal assistant, but Terra becomes more and more like Clover.
72	20	"Evil Valentine's Day" "Coup de Foudre à Haut Risque"	Rhonda Smiley	March 13, 2005	May 8, 2005	072
The girls are shocked to find that Jerry has fallen in love with their former episodic nanny Myrna Beesbottom, and that the two are getting married. Sam becomes suspicious of Myrna when Jerry falls from a cliff and Myrna does not rescue him. Sam heads over to Jerry's house and discovers the truth behind Myrna's actions. In the subplot, Clover and Alex are smitten with Guillaume, their new French pool boy.
73	21	"Halloween" "L'esprit d'Halloween"	Richard Clark	February 27, 2005	May 9, 2005	073
Clover is stuck babysitting Chucky, the obnoxious son of her Mom's best friend, on Halloween night, but luckily she is able to rope Sam and Alex into hanging out with her so it will not be such a drag. The girls take Chucky trick or treating in the eerie gated community he lives in, but none of the neighbors seem to be home. They soon find out that a demon inadvertently awakened by Mandy has taken over the gated community and turned its inhabitants into ghouls bent on taking over the world. Clover unwillingly becomes a hideous ghoul, undergoing another painful transformation. In the subplot, Jerry is going to his first ever Halloween party and keeps seeking the girls' advice on costumes.
74	22	"Power Yoga Much?" "Super Yoga ?"	Ben Joseph & Franck Young	February 20, 2005	May 22, 2005	074
A hot new yoga studio has been gaining popularity, however, when it is connected to a series of kidnappings, the spies are put on the case. They discover that the mysterious figure behind the craze is none other than Shirley, the Power Yoga Chi-Kwon-Do instructor from the Boy Bands episode. Bitter over losing her studio, she is back for revenge and has gathered up people from her original classes (including Mandy) to join her in her quest for power. Sam is brainwashed into supporting Shirley, leaving Alex and Clover, along with Jerry and his WOOHP agents to save the day. In the subplot, Sam's gym teacher threatens to place Sam in a remedial class for failing wall climbing.
75	23	"Head Shrinker Much?" "Le Laveur de Cerveau"	John Slama	March 6, 2005	May 29, 2005	075
The girls investigate a riot at their favorite mall, and discover that a useless professor has been transforming the locals into acting like cavemen. While they chase him down, Alex is affected by the de-evolutionary rays. In the subplot, Sam takes charm school lessons in order to impress an extremely cultured boy at school who leads a student committee for a dance party event.
76	24	"Evil Promotion Much? – Parts 1, 2 & 3" "Une Promotion d'enfer – Parties 1, 2 & 3"	Robert Lamoreaux, Michelle Lamoreaux & Nicole Demerse	May 11, 2005	July 31, 2005	076
77	25	"Evil Promotion Much? – Parts 1, 2 & 3" "Une Promotion d'enfer – Parties 1, 2 & 3"	Robert Lamoreaux, Michelle Lamoreaux & Jef Biederman	May 18, 2005	July 31, 2005	077
78	26	"Evil Promotion Much? – Parts 1, 2 & 3" "Une Promotion d'enfer – Parties 1, 2 & 3"	Robert Lamoreaux, Michelle Lamoreaux & Richard Clark	May 25, 2005	July 31, 2005	078
Sam, Clover and Alex learn that they have been selected as candidates to become super spies. At WOOHP's training center, they meet administrator Terence and an attractive WOOHP agent named Dean. Following their first day, there is an earthquake and then the center's walls begin to close in, forcing the girls to escape out a window, but Dean disappears. The girls learn shortly afterwards that Terence has kidnapped Dean. Terence forces the girls to eliminate Jerry and to take his hidden microchip. Jerry hatches a plan to fake his death and to give the girls a fake microchip, but during the ensuing struggle, he accidentally plunges into the river. When they return to the center, they discover that Dean has sided with Terence. They are rescued by a mysterious pilot who reveals himself to be Jerry. At Antarctica, they confront Terence, but he is able to capture Jerry and use his chip to activate a set of Jerry-like androids, which he uses to attack WOOHP headquarters. Meanwhile, Dean frees the girls and reveals he only sided with Terence to get close to him. He and the girls are able to follow Terence, Jerry, and the androids and stop them from blowing up WOOHP. The girls are promoted to super spies, but Terence escapes from WOOHP prison. In the subplot, Alex starts the rabbit diet, eating nothing but carrot-flavored food and drink, Sam decides to get a new look, after declaring her current look a Plain Jane, and Clover asks Dean to her debutante ball.

=== Season 4 (2005) ===
Season 4 first aired in 2005, in HD on the Voom's Animania HD channel in the United States before it premiered on TF1 in France, on Teletoon in Canada, on Cartoon Network in United States and otherwise internationally in 2006–2007.

No. overall	No. in season	English Title French Title	Written by	Original release date (Canada)	United States air date	Prod. code
79	1	"The Dream Teens" "Triplés de Rêve"	Richard Clark	March 13, 2006	April 3, 2006	079
Terence is back and he calls in Tim Scam, Helga Von Guggen, Boogie Gus, and Myrna Beesbottom to create the 'League Aiming to Menace and Overthrow Spies' (LAMOS). The girls meet triplet students Skyler, Tyler, and Wyler and go on dates with them. However, they discover strange happenings involving them, and feel more fatigued. It is revealed that the triplets are actually androids developed by Beesbottom who are able to drain the girls' energy and to use their acquired abilities and skills to invade WOOHP. In the subplot, Clover and Mandy compete to be on the third page of the yearbook as the high school's most photogenic girl.
80	2	"Futureshock!" "Le Choc du Futur !"	Rhonda Smiley	March 14, 2006	April 4, 2006	080
During cheerleading practice, Mandy breaks a nail, but is offered a spot as a reporter on the school television. The girls are called in to clean up Jerry's office and organize the gadgets inventory. They discover a gadget that is actually a time machine which sends them 20-25 years into the future. While there, they are horrified to discover that Mandy has become a major media celebrity over Beverly Hills, and that she plans to make everyone like her as their future selves are being abducted.
81	3	"I Hate the Eighties" "Perdues Dans le Temps"	Melissa Clark	March 15, 2006	April 5, 2006	081
Boogie Gus invents a ray gun that makes people younger and dress like the 1980s. He uses the weapon to zap the spies and others in town. In the subplot, Jerry reunites with an old band member and thinks about getting back into the music business.
82	4	"The O.P." "Un Monde Parfait"	Therese Beaupre	March 16, 2006	April 6, 2006	082
Jerry gives the girls a vacation and a new car, but during their wild ride, the girls end up at Ocean Paradise (a.k.a. The O.P.), a seaside community where everyone acts very friendly and on their best behavior. However, the ideal and perfect society harbors a secret of brainwashing teens who disobey. When Alex is brainwashed, Sam and Clover must find a way to break the spell. In the subplot, Clover is looking for the perfect guy and thinks she found him while at The O.P.
83	5	"Evil Jerry" "Frères Ennemis"	Ben Joseph & Frank Young	March 29, 2006	April 12, 2006	083
When Jerry receives a bag of his favorite chocolates, he thanks the girls but becomes increasingly angry after eating one. The girls soon get involved in a series of accidents, and trace the cause to the chocolates which contain the DNA of his evil twin brother Terrence. From its dark influence, Jerry has turned evil and has allied with his vile twin and the rest of L.A.M.O.S. who have taken over WOOHP; they attempt to reform the girls with the evil DNA. In the subplot, Mandy and her cronies form a "spy club" with Spy Chic fashionable clothing, but her paparazzi-like activities irritate Clover and Alex.
84	6	"Alex Gets Schooled" "Alex Déménage !"	Nicole Demerse	March 17, 2006	April 7, 2006	084
After receiving Mandy's report card in which she has failed all her classes, Alex is fooled, and gets sent to Dorsal Academy in England. But the new boarding school is rather bizarre with students acting more like dolphins in their conversation, their choice of food, and their swimming ability, not to mention their noses. With Alex being abducted, Sam and Clover head to England and discover that the principal plans to turn everyone into dolphins as revenge for humans trashing the oceans. In the subplot, while Alex is at the academy, Jerry is forced to live with Sam and Clover, where he turns out to be an annoying houseguest, using Clover's sweater as a rag, leaving pizza on the floor, much to Sam's annoyance, and throwing a party while the two are saving Alex and the other students.
85	7	"Attack of the 50 Ft. Mandy" "Méga Mandy !!!"	Richard Elliott & Simon Racioppa	March 26, 2006	April 11, 2006	085
To win the Miss Beverly Hills pageant, Clover arranges an automated full-body makeover, only to discover that Mandy is participating as well and has booked the same treatment. Meanwhile, the villain Diminutive Smalls escapes prison and seeks vengeance against Clover by altering her makeover bed; however, he mistakenly modifies Mandy's machine instead. Afterward, Mandy suspiciously begins to grow taller, stronger, and more aggressive. When the spies are called to investigate a fifteen-foot-tall girl abducting pageant contestants, they soon deduce that the culprit is Mandy, who has become a 50-foot-tall giant.
86	8	"Deja Cruise" "Une Croisière Sans Fin…"	Richard Clark	May 3, 2006	April 18, 2006	086
The episode starts with the girls battling a robot near a pier that contains crates filled with raw fish. The girls defeat the robot, but their spy suits end up smelling like raw fish. The next day (Saturday) Clover complains that she should be on a date, Alex says she should be getting her hair done, and Sam says she should be curled up with a good book. Clover then suggests that the spies should be retiring, not scrubbing their spy suits. Jerry sends the spies off for a holiday on the WOOHPtanic, but when a villain hijacks the ship and causes it to sink, the girls wake up aboard the ship with events beginning to repeat themselves such as Sam's recurring encounter with a passenger who asks for suntan lotion, Alex's trying to get her hair styled from a robot but it keeps reverting, and Clover's trying to hit on an uninterested lifeguard. Despite their attempts, the villain still wins, and the ship sinks, starting the cycle over. The girls learn that the entire situation was just another W.O.O.H.P test, and the lesson they had to learn was that even though they are superspies, it's ok for them to ask for help.
87	9	"Arnold the Great" "Arnold le Magnifique"	Jeff Schechter	April 12, 2006	April 14, 2006	087
Following a humiliation in the lunchroom, Arnold is left depressed. That night, as they watch someone breaking into an armored van, Arnold dressed as a superhero appears, and attempts to capture the man. The van traps Arnold, and drives off a cliff, but Sam, Clover, and Alex save him. They tell Arnold to keep their identities secret and to not get involved anymore, however, Geraldine Husk appears and motivates Arnold to continue going. The next day, Arnold's superhero alter ego has been reported saving people, but the device is secretly brainwashing Arnold to destroy the spies. In the subplot, Alex houses a lost puppy, but makes Jerry take care of him when she goes on missions.
88	10	"0067" "Jerry Superstar"	Rhonda Smiley	April 5, 2006	April 13, 2006	088
Jerry is invited to star in a spy film, leaving the girls in charge of WOOHP business. But a series of kidnappings of Hollywood's top producers brings a trail that points to Jerry. The girls discover that the director is actually WOOHP villain Marco Lumiere, but must convince Jerry, who stubbornly believes all the events are part of their film production.
89	11	"Mime Your Own Business" "Mime-Toi de tes Affaires"	Ben Joseph & Frank Young	March 22, 2006	April 10, 2006	089
A mime named Jazz Hands uses his accordion to transform entertainers into silent mimes. During the pursuit, Sam and Alex are zapped to mimes. In the subplot, Alex has developed a habit of sharing Sam and Clover's deepest secrets, so Sam and Clover strive to find a way to keep her quiet.
90	12	"Mani-Maniac Much?" "Une Manucure d'Enfer"	Nicole Demerse	April 19, 2006	April 17, 2006	090
A former famous manicurist has plotted revenge on a nail salon for stealing his customers by using his former customers as minions. And things go from bad to worse for the spies when Clover ends up becoming one of his minions, leaving only Sam and Alex to stop the powerful army from destroying their favorite nail salon. In the subplot, Clover and Mandy compete over who has the best nails to become a model for the Miss Mega Mani Mania, only to eventually learn that only the winner's hands are to be photographed.
91	13	"Evil Bouquets Are So Passe" "Bouquets Piégés"	Nicole Demerse	May 10, 2006	April 19, 2006	091
The spies are sent to investigate a wave of cases where men have fallen into a deep sleep, causing heartbreak to their significant others. At the house of one of the guys, they discover a plant that is able to move on its own as well as spray sleeping gas. They trace the plant's habitat to a remote island in the Indian Ocean where they discover a botanist named Violet Vanderfleet is planning to use her flowers called the Viola Vanderfleetus to destroy the male half of civilization, citing her own failed relationships as motivation. In the subplot, when Clover realizes that Sam has a study date with her ex-boyfriend Fernando, she gets very jealous.
92	14	"Evil Heiress Much?" "Princesse d'Enfer"	Richard Elliott & Simon Racioppa	May 17, 2006	April 20, 2006	092
Three of the richest people in the world have disappeared. The girls are sent to protect the fifth richest person (having to skip over the fourth richest due to his confidence in his security system), the materialistic and conceited heiress Milan Stilton who has a particularly nasty robotic dog, Fufu. However, when the fourth richest person also disappears, the girls suspect Milan Stilton might be involved. In the subplot, Sam is annoyed by the materialistic lifestyle of the rich and famous, and ponders getting rid of her stuff.
93	15	"Evil Ice Cream Man Much?" "Totalement Givré !"	Jeff Schechter	May 31, 2006	May 5, 2006	093
The girls must track down the cause of people being flash frozen based on the sound of a short motif that was recorded at the scene. Their pursuit leads to an ice cream truck, and a factory where its owner has been disgruntled by the snack and dessert trends taking away his customers, so he plans to freeze everyone and everything with his ice cream. In the subplot, Alex is seen in a new dress by her date prior to the event, and it leads to a streak of bad dating luck.
94	16	"Sis-KaBOOM-Bah!" "Sis-KaBOOM-Bah !"	Rhonda Smiley	May 24, 2006	April 21, 2006	094
As Clover and Mandy compete for head cheerleader of their high school, the girls are called to investigate the mysterious disappearance of top cheerleaders nationwide. After checking Buffy's house, they find a scrap of paper with a partly torn logo. Mandy then disappears. While checking Mandy's locker, they find a training DVD which Clover watches but she becomes brainwashed too. It is revealed that the disappearances and brainwashes are the product of WOOHP prisoner Candy Sweet who uses the girls to break out of prison.
95	17	"Beauty Is Skin Deep" "La Beauté Plastiquée"	Ben Joseph & Frank Young	June 7, 2006	June 26, 2006	095
The girls are called to find the reason why women in Paris have been running away crying over their looks. They find one of the women, who has an ugly expression and trace the beauty products to a designer named Miss Vanity who has been recruiting models. The former beauty queen creates products that give the wearer any emotion they chose, but the problem is that Miss Vanity chooses the emotion and the makeup changes their appearance as such. Sam and Alex are sprayed with happiness and poutiness respectively. In the subplot, Clover is rejected by a boy and gives up trying to maintain her good looks.
96	18	"Like, So Totally Not Spies – Parts 1 & 2" "Totalement pas Spies – Parties 1 & 2"	Ben Joseph & Frank Young	July 5, 2006	n/a	096
97	19	"Like, So Totally Not Spies – Parts 1 & 2" "Totalement pas Spies – Parties 1 & 2"	Ben Joseph & Frank Young	July 12, 2006	n/a	097
As they are at the fair, the spies are given three bracelets from an awful woman. Unfortunately, the woman who gives away the bracelets is none other than Helga Von Guggen, wearing an awful disguise. Worse still, the spies never recognized her, and she managed to lure them into her trap. As soon as they put the bracelets on their wrists, the spies suddenly pass out. When they wake up at long last, they forget everything about being spies at WOOHP, believing they are ordinary girls. Jerry goes into a fashion store, only to be captured by L.A.M.O.S., and trapped in their submarine. He hears about their evil plan, and tries to warn the girls. At school, they hear what Jerry has to say to them. Unfortunately, they do not believe in him, and they put the communicator in the trash can. Later, the girls go to a sushi bar, only to be attacked by Terence, Helga and Boogie Gus. Luckily they escape, and they actually want to talk to Jerry to find out what is going on. The girls manage to recover the communicator and speak with Jerry. He says to them the bracelets on their wrists brainwashed their memory of being spies. The girls cannot take off the bracelets. They go to help Jerry, but are also captured by L.A.M.O.S., while Terence plans to give every WOOHP agent a bracelet to make them forget about everything at WOOHP and leave so he can take over WOOHP. The water breaks the bracelets apart, and the spies' memory of being spies comes back again. At long last, Jerry and the spies defeat L.A.M.O.S. - Terrence, Helga Von Guggen and Boogie Gus and save WOOHP. In the end, Jerry sends the spies to shopping and the spies say they love the spy job.
98	20	"The Suavest Spy" "Un Ennemi Trop Craquant"	Richard Clark	August 5, 2006	n/a	098
The girls are called to spy on Kyle Katz, a jewel thief who has never been caught and who plans a large heist on a special night where Venus, Earth, and some other planets are aligned. Kyle is extremely attractive to the three girls and is also aware that they have been watching him. After several failures to catch him in the act, the girls must stop him from stealing a rare pearl. In the subplot, when Sam wins first place in the science fair, she becomes the target of all the nerd boys at school who chase her and want her to sign their T-shirts of her.
99	21	"Spy Soccer" "Foot de Fou !"	Nicole Demerse	August 6, 2006	n/a	099
Beverly High's soccer team coach has retired, leaving Alex rather depressed about it, until she meets Bonita Bikham, a young woman who becomes the new coach. However, Bikham uses a soccer ball that contains a mind-control chip which changes Alex and two other girls into aggressive and powerful soccer players. Meanwhile, Jerry has Clover and Sam investigate the break in of a high tech bio lab. In the subplot, Jerry is obsessed and distracted with typing on his computer, and is ultimately revealed to be playing a computer soccer game.
100	22	"Spies on the Farm" "Les Spies à la Ferme"	Nicole Demerse	August 9, 2006	n/a	100
The spies are sent to investigate the mysterious disappearances of some shop owners in a town. They go undercover as farm workers, and uncover a demented farmer's plot to turn humans into vegetable-like beings. It is up to the spies to save the day. In the subplot, after a recent mission where Clover refuses to rescue Alex and Sam from a river, Alex and Sam accuse Clover of being afraid to get her hands dirty, so Clover attempts to prove them wrong.
101	23	"Spies in Space" "Les Spies dans l'Espace"	Richard Clark	August 15, 2006	August 3, 2006	101
The spies are sent to the moon to rescue a popular band called the Alpha Centauris who have gone missing. It is revealed that the leader of the band called Ziggy is also the villain. In the subplot, Sam is told she can graduate early because of her outstanding grades; she ponders whether to move on from college when she meets Chad, an attractive high school boy who has a rep of not dating high school students.
102	24	"Totally Busted! – Parts 1, 2 & 3" "Totalement Grillées – Parties 1, 2 & 3"	Robert Lamoreaux & Michelle Lamoreaux	February 1, 2007	March 8, 2007	102
103	25	"Totally Busted! – Parts 1, 2 & 3" "Totalement Grillées – Parties 1, 2 & 3"	Robert Lamoreaux & Michelle Lamoreaux	February 2, 2007	March 8, 2007	103
104	26	"Totally Busted! – Parts 1, 2 & 3" "Totalement Grillées – Parties 1, 2 & 3"	Robert Lamoreaux & Michelle Lamoreaux	February 5, 2007	March 8, 2007	104
Mandy and her crony friends are infected by a chemical called SUDS (dropped from Alex's backpack and spilled into Mandy's hot tub) to become spy hunters or "spy-'ssassins", attacking the girls in their regular lives. Meanwhile, after capturing a villain called the Inventor, the girls return to find that their mothers have returned. Learning that their daughters have been spies, the mothers order their daughters to quit, but they refuse, saying it's their lives' work. The girls later try to spy on Mandy, finding the SUDS vial, but they are caught by their moms again, and are prohibited from seeing each other as they now scheme to commit their filicide for refusing to quit WOOHP upon disowning them. This soon becomes clear that the spy-'ssassins have been posing as the girls' mothers to eliminate them. Having fallen into a death trap by the spy-'ssassins, the girls send Jerry a letter for help, then forced to retreat to Mandy's chalet at the Sugarflake Resort (before the dynamite attached to the ropes that tied them onto their own beds detonates), where they finally find and rescue their real mothers from a runaway gondola lift. Later, they fight with the spy-'ssassins, but Jerry's arrival causes an avalanche. In the chaos, all three girls' mothers are safe, but the girls themselves have seemingly sacrificed themselves to enable their mothers to escape the confusion. In order to make up for their daughters' sacrifice against the spy-'ssassins, Gabriella, Stella and Carmen demand that Jerry train them to become spies, like their daughters' in order to find and save them. The girls tell Mandy about the SUDS, but Mandy uses the remaining vial to infect them. Jerry and the moms discover that the spies are alive but are fighting each other. They arrive to rescue the girls, but the spy-'ssassins free the Inventor from prison, and plan to spray the entire world with SUDS. The girls and their moms arrive to foil their plans. Afterwards, the girls agree not to withhold any more secrets, although it is revealed that the moms are going to work for WOOHP too, much to their surprise.

=== Season 5 (2007) ===
Season 5 was broadcast on TF1 in France, on Teletoon in Canada, on Animania HD in the United States and otherwise internationally in 2007–2008, then later broadcast on Cartoon Network in 2010. It was the last season to be shown in 16:9 high-definition on the Voom's Animania HD channel before it ceased operations in 2009.

No. overall	No. in season	English Title French Title	Written by	Original release date (Canada)	United States air date	Prod. code
105	1	"Evil Graduation" "Le lycée Éternel !"	Robert Lamoreaux & Michelle Lamoreaux	August 31, 2007	April 26, 2010	105
It is graduation time at Beverly High, but just as the ceremony gets underway, the entire graduating class, including Sam, Clover, and Alex, mysteriously black out. When they wake up, they are surprised to find themselves back at school. They soon discover they have been relocated to a reproduction of the school thanks to Chet, a classmate and captain of the football team who plans to imprison everyone in their high school lives forever. In a sub-plot, the girls fear that they will have to part ways after graduation until Alex suggests they all go to Malibu University to stay together.
106	2	"Evil Roommate" "La Colocataire Diabolique !"	Robert Lamoreaux & Michelle Lamoreaux	September 12, 2007	April 27, 2010	106
Sam, Clover, and Alex arrive at Malibu University (or Mali-U for short), a gorgeous school overlooking the Pacific Ocean as they prepare to begin their lives as college students. However, because they enrolled at the last minute, Sam has to room with Stacy, a sophomore, while Alex and Clover room across the hall. Stacy at first appears to be scholarly and friendly, but is revealed to be very competitive as shown during Sam's quantum physics class. When Jerry tells the spy girls that several incoming freshmen have gone missing, Sam uncovers a plot by Stacy to suck the knowledge out of their brains, but ends up being captured by Stacy.
107	3	"Evil Professor" "Un Cours Diabolique !"	Robert Lamoreaux & Michelle Lamoreaux	September 19, 2007	April 28, 2010	107
The girls enroll in Espionage 101, hoping to get an easy A. Professor Fremont is impressed by the girls, and puts them on an assignment to steal an item from a lab as part of an re-enactment of a famous espionage mission. The girls are able to complete the assignment; however, they are arrested the next morning. They later learn that Fremont is a fake and that there was no such mission. They also learn that Fremont is actually a spy reject and that he plans to use the stolen device, which expands anything it zaps, to blow up the entire world. In the subplot, Sam, Clover, and Alex get part-time jobs at the campus coffee shop in order to pay for the rent on their new penthouse. They also meet Mandy's cousin, Mindy.
108	4	"The Granny" "Super Mamie"	Nicole Demerse	October 10, 2007	April 29, 2010	108
Jerry has the girls transport a criminal to WOOHP's highest security penitentiary. But the dangerous person is Granny, a sweet-looking elderly woman who even bakes cookies for the girls. Letting their guard down, the girls are tricked as Granny commandeers their vehicle and later reunites with her elderly friends to get back to their bank robbing habits. In the subplot, Clover meets and falls in love with Blaine, the captain of the Mali-U volleyball team.
109	5	"Another Evil Boyfriend" "Le Nouveau Petit Ami"	Nicole Demerse	October 15, 2007	April 30, 2010	109
Blaine and Clover are officially a couple. However, Clover's spy life is not running so smoothly. While on mission to capture the latest villain called The Mallrat, Clover is held captive by his supposed henchman until Alex and Sam rescue her. When they find a volleyball pump at the crime scene, they suspect the assailant could be Blaine, which Clover disbelieves, until her picnic lunch explodes. After further investigation, they discover Blaine has been spying on Clover and wants to get rid of her.
110	6	"Return of Geraldine" "Le Retour de Géraldine"	Nicole Demerse	September 26, 2007	May 3, 2010	110
With Blaine off on a top-secret mission, Clover tries to cheer herself up by doing all the things she loves to do—going to her fave members-only spa; shopping at her fave boutique; and eating at her favorite veggie restaurant. Unfortunately, "Operation Self-Love" does not go quite as planned. Clover is horrified to discover that the boutique has been replaced with a thrift; the veggie restaurant is a steakhouse; and the spa is open to the public. Little does Clover realize, this is just a beginning of her world crumbling around her. When she returns to her dorm, Sam accuses her for stealing a paper she wrote and handing it as her own, and Alex accuses her for borrowing her car and trashing it. Clover denies both accusations, but the proof seems to be irrefutable. In fact, Sam and Alex are so miffed that they request a housing change and tell Jerry that they no longer want to work with Clover. Jerry says that this will not be a problem because, after catching her on video stealing classified WOOHP weaponry, she is suspended. Clover is beside herself. It is as if her world is collapsing around her, and she is beginning to think it is no coincidence. Upon investigation, she eventually discovers that her old nemesis Geraldine is to blame. Before she can call Blaine for help out of desperation, she receives a distress call. Blaine has been captured by Geraldine.
111	7	"Evil Sorority" "Le Clan des Diaboliques"	Robert Lamoreaux & Michelle Lamoreaux	October 3, 2007	May 4, 2010	111
It is Greek week at Mali-U and Clover is pledging a sorority: Phi Epsilon Phi—or PEP for short. Although she encounters Mandy and Mindy as pledges, she persists through the recruiting process. Meanwhile, Sam and Alex investigate a break-in at a lab, discovering a broken diamond tipped heel at the scene. The PEP leader brainwashes the pledges into abducting and/or trashing the other sororities as revenge for not getting into any sororities the year before.
112	8	"Evil Gymnasts" "Des Gymnastes D'enfer !"	Robert Lamoreaux & Michelle Lamoreaux	October 24, 2007	May 5, 2010	112
Jerry brings the girls with him to Paris, France to work out of WOOHP's European office located under the Eiffel Tower. Their first mission is to find the whereabouts of the Romanian women's gymnastics team. They discover that the coach has been training them to be exceptional but that she has really been stealing the agility of the monkeys at the local zoo. The girls go undercover as a rival gymnastic team but Clover is brainwashed by the coach; she and the entire gymnastics team go after Alex and Sam. In the subplot, Alex researches her family tree and meets up with her supposed relatives in France.
113	9	"Evil Pizza Guys" "Pizzaïolos D'enfer !"	Robert Lamoreaux & Michelle Lamoreaux	November 7, 2007	May 6, 2010	113
The girls' adventures in Europe continue as they take a break by traveling to Rome, but get lost along the way. They find a nearby town which is under attack by two chefs who are fighting each other with destructive calzones and pizzas. After getting them to have a truce, they are informed by Jerry that several major chefs have been abducted. Upon reaching Rome, they find the abductors are the same two guys.
114	10	"Evil Shoe Designer" "Une Mode D'enfer !"	Robert Lamoreaux & Michelle Lamoreaux	November 14, 2007	May 7, 2010	114
The girls investigate the disappearance of various European fashion critics, and discover that the person behind it is none other than Yves Mont Blanc, who is Clover's favorite shoe designer. Yves plans to control the critics by putting them in special boots to spread his influence at a fashion show. In the subplot, the girls are reacquainted with Guillaume, their former French pool boy, and this time they think he has a crush on Sam when he really wants her to be his apprentice.
115	11	"Virtual Stranger" "Attaque Virtuelle"	Ben Joseph & Franck Young	November 21, 2007	May 10, 2010	115
When Sam, Clover, and Alex find themselves under attack at various locations throughout Mali-U, they begin to suspect, because of the nature of the assaults, that past villains are to blame. However, when Jerry informs them that those villains are still secured in the WOOHP prison system, the girls are perplexed. They eventually discover that their friend Britney is possessed by a being able to assume these villains' forms following an accident involving her virtual training. In the subplot, the girls get a bad reputation among their dorm mates for trashing the residential area and have to go undercover whenever they are near the building.
116	12	"WOOHPersize Me!" "Aéro-WOOHP !"	Richard Clark	November 28, 2007	May 11, 2010	116
The four girls (which now includes Britney) discover that a new exercise trend has been going around campus, and it involves using special moves taught at WOOHP. Jerry has them track down who is responsible. They raid Mandy and Mindy's room to learn the name of who has been producing the video and track him down at his lab in Peru. However, they are unable to catch him there, and must return to Mali-U before the video becomes public. The video also contains trance music that brainwashes its listeners.
117	13	"Evil Hotel" "L'Hôtel des Abysses"	Ben Joseph & Franck Young	December 5, 2007	May 12, 2010	117
Clover tries to reserve a getaway at an underwater hotel but is denied for not being a VIP. Jerry gives the girls two missions: first, to find who or what has been raising the Earth's water levels, and second, to find out who has been kidnapping celebrities such as the attempt on T-Bone, who is Alex's and Britney's favorite music performer. Alex eventually gets over her jealousy of Britney, although a new jealousy is started when Britney is informed she will be working in WOOHP Australia with Blaine.
118	14	"Totally Mystery Much?" "Totally Mystère !"	Rhonda Smiley	December 12, 2007	May 13, 2010	118
Scientists make a startling discovery in the Antarctic—a Yeti-like snow creature frozen in a block of ice. Meanwhile, Jerry informs Sam, Clover and Alex that there have been reports of a strange being terrorizing a posh ski resort. When they arrive to investigate the luxurious place, they find that they are not the only ones on the case—they meet Martin Mystery, a teenage paranormal investigator working for The Center—an organization much like WOOHP. In the subplot, Clover is worried that she has become a geek magnet.: Notes: The events of the crossover special take place after the final episode of the series.
119	15	"Evil Sushi Chef" "L'Attaque du Sushi Géant !!!"	Robert Lamoreaux & Michelle Lamoreaux	December 26, 2007	May 14, 2010	119
The spies are sent to investigate a series of attacks on sushi restaurants. Clover and Alex follow the trail and discover that a sushi chef has been enlarging and mind-controlling octopuses to destroy. However, Sam is heavily distracted with a second mission: to track the activities of recently released WOOHP prisoner Jazz Hands without telling her friends.
120	16	"Miss Spirit Fingers" "Miss Mic-Mac"	Richard Clark	January 2, 2008	May 17, 2010	120
Concerned about Sam's recent behavior of skipping classes, cutting out on missions and lying, Alex and Clover decide to spy on her, but are first sent on a mission by Jerry to deal with an evil villain at a playground, which turns out to just be a kid who was playing dodgeball. They later discover that Sam is allying with Jazz Hands under the guise of Miss Spirit Fingers. When Sam steals a microchip from a high tech lab, Alex and Clover chase her down and capture her, taking her to WOOHP Prison, but Jerry releases her and reveals the plan to the girls. In the subplot, Mandy and Mindy move into the girls' penthouse, redecorating while the girls were on their mission, after a water pipe in their dorm room breaks.
121	17	"Mime World" "Le Monde des Mimes"	Richard Clark	January 13, 2008	May 18, 2010	121
Jazz Hands opens his own theme park: Mime World. Sam continues her undercover work as Miss Spirit Fingers as she brings the microchip to Jazz Hands, while Alex and Clover go undercover as geeky tourists. They discover an exhibit in which the visitors are being transformed into a mime army, and that Jazz Hands is on to them. He turns Sam into a mime and then has his army attack Beverly Hills to turn everyone there into mimes. In the subplot, Jerry develops a new hair tonic, but it causes hair to grow everywhere else on his head besides the top.
122	18	"Evil Mascot" "La Mascotte Infernale !"	Robert Lamoreaux & Michelle Lamoreaux	January 20, 2008	May 19, 2010	122
When strange attacks on students are reported all over the Mali-U campus, Jerry enlists Sam, Clover. and Alex to check it out. The girls trace the attacks to Sigmund Smith, a guy in a bird costume who is the mascot of the rival Riptide State, who had lost to Mali-U in their previous Beach Sport Mega Tournaments. The guy has plans to knock out Mali-U's top athletes, but expands them to wrecking the entire tournament. In the subplot, Alex is selected to be the new Mali-U mascot, only instead of getting to wear a cute mermaid costume, she is forced to dress as a can of dolphin-safe tuna.: Note: In this episode, Alex handles Sigmund Smith's neglected kitten without any allergic reaction.
123	19	"The Show Must Go On... Or Else" "Coup de Théâtre !"	Robert Lamoreaux & Michelle Lamoreaux	January 27, 2008	May 20, 2010	123
After having dated a bunch of hunks with no brains, Clover decides to try her hand at a theater class. The instructor is quite compelling, and casts Clover in one of his musical plays as a lamp post. Later on, the girls notice that Mandy, Virgil and other students have been acting rather strange and melodramatic. While Clover thinks it is just method acting, Alex and Sam discover that the instructor has been hypnotizing people and have to stop him.
124	20	"Zero to Hero" "Zéro Le Héros…"	Rhonda Smiley	February 3, 2008	May 21, 2010	124
Jerry sends the girls on a mission where they quickly capture a strong and bulky guy who is dressed in a Humongo Man superhero costume. Virgil, the Mali-U Café supervisor, asks Alex out, but the date goes so badly that she only wants to be just friends with him. However, Virgil does not give up. When he discovers that Alex and the other girls are spies, and comes across a serum that makes him stronger, he uses it to bulk up and try to be a real action hero to save Alex from the dangers around campus. In the subplot, Clover and Sam compete over Employee of the Month honors at Mali-U Café, which comes with the use of a fashionable eco-friendly car.
125	21	"WOOHP-tastic" "WOOHP-tastic !"	Robert Lamoreaux & Michelle Lamoreaux	February 10, 2008	May 24, 2010	125
At the annual WOOHP picnic, the girls are surprised when Clover is given the Most WOOHP-tastic Agent award for her apprehension of Senor Starchy, an evil dry cleaner bent on "straightening out the world" and who has eluded WOOHP for decades. She quickly develops a big head after hearing about the perks which include use of the WOOHP limo and a personal robotic assistant. In a subsequent mission, she barely lifts a finger to help out, causing Alex and Sam to work separately from her and helping Dean, who has been placed in charge of the WOOHP gadgets. When Senor Starchy escapes, Clover must work solo, but is easily caught, and the other girls must rescue her.
126	22	"So Totally Not Groove-Y" "Totalement Pas Groove !"	Robert Lamoreaux & Michelle Lamoreaux	February 17, 2008	May 25, 2010	126
Clip show episode: Jerry awards the girls with an exclusive shopping spree at The Groove, complete with WOOHP-ons (coupons). However, something is amiss as the girls encounter strange vendors, then a bunch of robots that want to kill them, and that they are unable to escape the mall. Meanwhile the girls look back on their previous adventures.
127	23	"Ho-Ho-Ho No!" "Ho-ho-ho-Non !"	Rhonda Smiley	February 24, 2008	May 26, 2010	127
It is the holiday season but the Spies do not get a vacation. Their latest mission is to investigate an Unidentified Flying Object—right above Beverly Hills. After the Spies finish investigating, Bev Hills gets a strange weather twist in the form of a blizzard. While everyone is snowed in, the Spies race to find the culprit and stop the snow before the town is completely buried. In the subplot, the girls take part in the Mali-U dorm Secret Santa exchange, only to discover that their gifts are going to Mandy.
128	24	"Totally Icky" "Totalement Crado !"	Robert Lamoreaux & Michelle Lamoreaux	March 2, 2008	May 27, 2010	128
When freaky occurrences start to happen all around Beverly Hills—filthy tornadoes, floods of sludge, and huge run-away dust bunnies, Jerry sends the spies to investigate the strange phenomenon. The girls discover that someone seems to be purposely scumming up their city. The Spies track down their only clue—a feather from a feather duster. In the subplot, Alex gets into trouble when she accidentally litters on campus.
129	25	"Totally Dunzo – Parts 1 & 2" "Totally Fini – Parties 1 & 2"	Robert Lamoreaux & Michelle Lamoreaux	March 12, 2008	May 28, 2010	129
130	26	"Totally Dunzo – Parts 1 & 2" "Totally Fini – Parties 1 & 2"	Robert Lamoreaux & Michelle Lamoreaux	March 19, 2008	June 1, 2010	130
When Jerry's mother accidentally ingests a concentrated dose of pure evil, she becomes evil. Going under the alias "Mr. X", she tricks Jerry into selling WOOHP and replacing them with robots. The Spies are stupefied at the sudden turn of events, and when a crime spree begins at the mall, the robots barely react. The girls call Jerry to see what's going on, but he gets kidnapped by the robots. They follow the robots to Mrs. Lewis' house to find Jerry, their three fellow spies-Britney, Dean, Blaine, and Mandy trapped there. Mrs. Lewis reveals her plot and orders the robots to kill them. Fortunately they use Jerry's new machine to destroy evil all over the world, but the machine only works on humans, not robots. They go meet up with the robots and eventually beat them. Plus, fortunately, Alex finally stops being jealous of Britney once and for all. With evil eradicated around the world, the girls ride off, promising to see Jerry again. In the subplot, Mandy has her life flash before her eyes, and realizes that she has been a bad person to the girls, so she tries to be friendly to them, at least until she realizes they have been hiding the fact that they are spies from her and Jerry decided he will retire for good.

=== Season 6 (2012) ===
The sixth season of Totally Spies! was announced by French television network TF1 in an online article back in 2011 and premiered on September 4, 2013, in France. It was the first season to be produced and broadcast in 16:9 high-definition.

No. overall	No. in season	English Title French Title	Written by	Original release date (France)	Canadian air date	Prod. code
131	1	"The Anti-Social Network" "Mandybook"	Michelle Lamoreaux & Robert Lamoreaux	September 4, 2013	September 7, 2014	131
Jerry returns and informs the spies to investigate a strange, mind-controlling frequency emanating from on campus, and they find a house full of appliances that attack them. Meanwhile, Mandy is thrilled that an anonymous fan has created a social network called Mandybook, making her the most popular girl on campus. Problems arise when Mandy's fans suddenly turn on her and chase her down. The spies discover that the Mandybook creator, Telly Hardwire, is looking for revenge after Mandy who rejected his cyber-friend request back in high school. In the subplot, Clover signs herself and her two best friends for fashion design class, but it seems that her teacher doesn't like her style choices.
132	2	"Nine Lives" "Une vie de chat"	Michelle Lamoreaux & Robert Lamoreaux	September 4, 2013	September 14, 2014	132
The girls investigate strange occurrences worldwide in which landmarks such as Mount Rushmore reshaped with cat faces and the Leaning Tower of Pisa is carpeted like a cat tower. The girls have a claw found at the scene analyzed, and it is made of a combination of cat and human DNA. Meanwhile, Alex finds herself turning into a catgirl. In the subplot, Clover tries to hide the fact that she is majoring in fashion design from her mother Stella, who thinks she is a premed.: Alex has revealed that she is allergic to cats in "Wild Style"
133	3	"Vide-O-No!" "Jeux vidéo zéro"	Jeff Biederman	September 4, 2013	September 21, 2014	133
After video game developers around the world go missing, the spies are sent to investigate, as they hit a roadblock once they discover that a pixelating snowman appears to be the one behind the attacks. As they delve deeper into case, they discover the mastermind behind the abductions: Skip Joystick, a bitter game developer whose strange game designs were rejected by various video game companies in the world. In the subplot, the girls try to help Sam find a boyfriend.
134	4	"Super Mega Dance Party Yo!" "Super Méga Dance Show"	Nicole Demerse	September 5, 2013	September 28, 2014	134
When it is time to watch Clover's favorite TV dance competition show, "Super Mega Dance Party Yo!", Jerry informs the girls that three of the world's top dancers have been reported missing. After they depart to London to investigate, they return to Mali-U and discover that "Super Mega Dance Party Yo!" is holding auditions on campus. Alex is chosen to be on the show, but ends up missing just like the other dancers. Sam and Clover discover that Brick is to blame; having been, quite literally, born with two left feet, Brick's never been a good dancer himself, and is searching for a right foot to steal and make his own. In the subplot, the girls have to deal with having a new, very enthusiastic roommate.
135	5	"Pageant Problems" "Miss à tous prix"	Amy Wolfram	September 6, 2013	October 5, 2014	135
When the spies are sent to investigate a break-in at the WOOHP Experimental Lab, they discover that a top-secret, age-reducing serum has been stolen. After they find an odd clue on the lab's floor—a diamond-encrusted tiara with a red hair attached to it—they discover it belongs to a woman named Bertha Bombshell, an ex-girlfriend of Jerry. What the spies realize is that Bertha is an aging pageant queen bent on recapturing her former glory. The only problem is, after administering the serum onto herself, she is now experiencing all sorts of side effects—making her determined to not only destroy the latest pageant she has entered, but the spies as well. In the subplot, Sam is faced with a tough assignment in journalism class.
136	6	"Grabbing the Bully by the Horns" "Tel est pris qui croyait prendre"	Grant Sauvé	September 9, 2013	October 12, 2014	136
After a series of attacks and abductions occur in Hawaii, the spies are sent to the archipelago to discover that those who were being abducted were taken to an old, out-of-business amusement park in Japan by a robot. Later, they discover that the robot is controlled by the once-bullied Timmy, now out to get revenge on those who bullied him when he was a child. In the subplot, Mandy hires an actor bodyguard, and Alex reunites with her piglet Oinky.
137	7	"The Wedding Crasher" "Mariages et sabotages"	Michelle Lamoreaux & Robert Lamoreaux	September 10, 2013	October 19, 2014	137
A gala wedding is in full swing until the bride's wedding dress has a most sinister malfunction, leaving a wake of chaos in its path. After Jerry sends the spies on a mission to investigate, they quickly discover that many other similar events have been taking place across the world. As it turns out, Wera Van, a bitter wedding dress designer, is bent on getting revenge on the brides who rejected her designs. In the subplot, Sam tries to find a unique gift for her parents' anniversary.
138	8	"Celebrity Swipe!" "Célébrité volée"	Nicole Demerse	September 11, 2013	October 26, 2014	138
The spies are sent by Jerry to investigate the disappearance of Rad Smitt, one of Hollywood's most famous romantic leads. They find out that Rad, though acting a bit strangely, is not missing at all, and, in fact, has no memory of being kidnapped. But after one of the world's top soccer players, Alessandro, and a famous teenage heartthrob, Jason Wiebler, also disappear, the girls discover that Captain Hayes is the one to blame. This time, Hayes is determined to become a celebrity himself, by using a crazy machine he invented that steals celebrities' best attributes. In the subplot, Mandy auditions for a talent scout but her performances are foiled by Oinky.
139	9	"Super Sweet Cupcake Company" "Les délices de grand-mère"	Michelle Lamoreaux & Robert Lamoreaux	September 12, 2013	November 2, 2014	139
Banks across the globe become the target of a mysterious thief who has the strange ability to perform robberies without any resistance from any of the bankers. When the spies are sent to investigate, they eventually discover that The Granny has escaped prison and is using a mood-altering substance in her cupcakes to make people compliant. In the subplot, the girls wonder what their life would be like without Mandy always being so mean... until that actually happens when she has one of the cupcakes and becomes super sweet.
140	10	"The Dusk of Dawn" "Le cœur éternel"	Jeff Biederman	September 13, 2013	November 9, 2014	140
After defeating a robot at the National Mall, the girls return to watch Alex's current favorite movie, a fantasy film called The Dusk of Dawn. They are later summoned by Jerry to investigate strange disruptions in Beverly Hills, only to discover that the cause of the disruptions are the two main characters from the film who have carried their feud into the real world. It is up to the spies to save Beverly Hills and get these battling warriors back into their movie. In the subplot, Sam has a crush on the movie theater's bad boy usher and tries to change her image to be a rebel girl.
141	11	"Dog Show Showdown!" "Duel au concours canin"	Michelle Lamoreaux & Robert Lamoreaux	September 16, 2013	November 16, 2014	141
When WOOHP learns that several famous show dogs have vanished all across the globe, the girls are sent to investigate a penthouse in New York City while keeping watch over an award-winning pug named Mr. Billingsworth. During their stakeout, the dog disappears, but the trail of odd clues imply the abductor is neither human nor animal. As the girls go undercover at the West Hollywood Dog Show, they find that their villain is actually a dog show contestant who has never won an award. Not only has he built the perfect dog to enter the contest with, he is also programmed the pup to take out the competition. In the subplot, after the Warden deans find out about Oinky after a failed attempt at giving him a bath, Alex disguises Oinky as a pet dog in order to keep him at Mali-U.
142	12	"Mandy Doll Mania!" "La fureur des poupées Mandy"	Nicole Demerse	September 17, 2013	November 23, 2014	142
The girls are surprised to find that Mandy has launched a set of action figures called "Mandy Dolls" that have become extremely popular in town. Meanwhile, Jerry sends the spies to New Mexico to investigate the disappearance of high-tech military gear, where they are attacked in the dark. They learn that Seth Toyman, who was released from WOOHP Prison, is the Toymaker responsible for creating the Mandy Dolls, which are programmed to take them out. In the subplot, Jerry acts incredibly busy, but it is revealed that he has created a life-size robot version of himself.
143	13	"Evil Ice Skater" "Patineuse d'enfer !"	Jeff Biederman	September 18, 2013	November 30, 2014	143
People around the globe are mysteriously found frozen in blocks of ice, so Jerry sends the spies to investigate. As the girls follow leads to nab the perpetrator, they ultimately discover that the person behind the attacks is a wanna-be figure skater named Iceolina. Her plan is to take out the competition using her high-tech ice-skates while broadcasting her own figure skating competition where she is the only winner. In the subplot, Alex's father visits Mali-U to give a guest lecture.: Note: This episode has 2 continuity errors: 1.) Alex's dad is of a completely different appearance than when he was briefly seen in Alex Gets Schooled; 2.) Sam and Alex claim that they've never skated before despite being shown doing it in Ski Trip.
144	14	"Inferior Designer!" "Abominables décorations !"	Michelle Lamoreaux & Robert Lamoreaux	September 19, 2013	December 7, 2014	144
When top designers around the world begin disappearing, Jerry puts the girls on it. The spies investigate the Taj Mahal which has been decked out with terribly tacky interior designs. Sam, Clover and Alex's investigation then leads them to the White House, where they find the official interior designer has been put out of commission and a wildly crazy new designer, Maggie Trendset, has taken over—decorating everything in sight with awful, eyesore-esque designs. In the subplot, Clover must impress her fashion design professor in order to get the lone "A" grade on her mid-term project.
145	15	"WOOHP-Ahoy!" "À l'abordage !"	Nicole Demerse	September 20, 2013	December 14, 2014	145
Jerry has the girls visit the WOOHPtanic again so he can give a big gadget presentation. But while Jerry comes down with a cold, they are attacked by a pirate named Salty Schooner. Although Sam and Alex are able to escape, Clover is not so lucky—and soon finds herself not only captured, but also the object of Salty's affection. Salty uses one of Jerry's gadgets to supercharge the sun in order to melt the polar ice caps and flood the world.
146	16	"Trent Goes Wild" "Trent se rebelle"	Reid Harrison, Michelle Lamoreaux & Robert Lamoreaux	September 23, 2013	December 21, 2014	146
As the spies apprehend a ridiculous scorpion villain, Trent accidentally witnesses the girls in action. When Jerry tries to erase Trent's memory of the event, the tubes leading to the scorpion villain get mixed with Trent's. Trent starts to transform into the coolest guy at Mali U, as well as a scorpion man. And Scorpion-Trent's first order of business: get revenge on Mandy. It is up to the spies to save themselves and Mandy from the new Trent, as well as transform him back to his old self. In a subplot, the girls search for dates for the Spring Fling dance.
147	17	"Little Dude" "La chute du skateur"	Grant Sauvé	September 24, 2013	December 28, 2014	147
When Jerry gets word that bizarre things are happening to natural wonders of the world—i.e., the Grand Canyon and Mount Everest are being cemented over—the spies check it out. And they soon discover that a man with a strange, high-tech device is to blame. It seems that, in an effort to be an extreme skateboarder/snowboarder, "Lil' Dude" is trying to turn the world into an extreme skate park. In the subplot, Clover tries to become an extreme skater girl to impress a boy, despite not having skated on boards with wheels before.
148	18	"Totally Switched Again!" "Qui est qui ?"	Nicole Demerse	September 25, 2013	January 4, 2015	148
During a routine check of the WOOHP Containment Facility, Jerry encounters a most unexpected event—when Dr. Gray uses a homemade gadget to switch his body with Jerry's—allowing him to escape WOOHP. And now that he is free, he is determined to use all the resources that WOOHP has to offer to help him achieve his ultimate goal: switching the bodies of all of the humans on Earth so that they can learn to walk in each other's shoes. And as chaos begins to erupt around the planet, Sam, Clover and Alex start to realize that something is definitely up. It is up to the girls—with some help from Jerry's mum, who is the first one to realize that her son is not acting at all like himself—to not only stop Dr. Gray and save the world, but to save Jerry as well.
149	19	"Clowning Around!" "Poudre de clowns"	Charles-Henri Moarbes, Michelle Lamoreaux & Robert Lamoreaux	September 26, 2013	January 11, 2015	149
When people around the world suddenly turn up with crazy clown makeup all over their faces, acting more like circus performers than their normal selves, Jerry sends the spies to investigate. And what Sam, Clover and Alex quickly discover is that the people all share one thing in common: they used the same brand of makeup called Clownique (which at first looks like regular makeup, but shortly after it is applied, transforms into brightly colored clown-style makeup that will not come off). As the investigation continues, the girls discover the makeup is the brainchild of Bozette Slapstick, a disgruntled clown woman who is bitter that the world no longer appreciates clowns as much as they used to and is determined to force that appreciation by turning everyone into a clown (including Clover). In the subplot, the Warden deans assign Mandy to spy on the spies.
150	20	"Astro-Not!" "Astro mais pas trop !"	Jeff Biederman	September 27, 2013	January 18, 2015	150
Bizarre tide patterns popping up around the world prompt Jerry to have the spies investigate. They find that the culprit is a beam from outer space, clearly aimed at Earth for sinister intentions. Further investigation leads the spies to a deranged woman, Cosmo, who was kicked out of the space program for having a few screws loose. Now, in an effort to get revenge on the world, she is using a high-tech device to remove gravity from Earth—if she cannot go to outer space, she will bring outer space to Earth. It is up to the spies to stop her before they, and everyone and everything else on the planet, floats into space. In the subplot, Alex gets hooked on her daily horoscope to an extreme degree.
151	21	"Baddies on a Blimp" "Dirigeable en déroute"	Reid Harrison, Michelle Lamoreaux & Robert Lamoreaux	September 30, 2013	January 25, 2015	151
When Jerry summons the spies, the girls think that they are going to be called into duty to take down some crazed, criminal baddy. But what they quickly discover is this will be an assignment of a different type. Jerry wants the spies to use the WOOHP blimp to transport three villains—Yves Mont Blanc, Manny Wong and Violet Vanderfleet—to the WOOHP prison island. But as the spies head off on their mission, a freak lightning storm frees the baddies, who stage a mutiny with designs on releasing all prisoners from the island and leaving the spies there. In the subplot, Clover reconnects with her ex-boyfriends.
152	22	"Jungle Boogie" "La loi de la jungle"	Michelle Lamoreaux & Robert Lamoreaux	October 1, 2013	February 1, 2015	152
Aggressively growing plant life starts to overtake various parts of the world, so Jerry pulls the girls away from Spring Break to have them check it out. And as they do, the spies immediately find themselves having to battle the plants which seem to have turned on them. Ultimately, they discover that the plants are starting to take over the world and that Shelly Junglelove is behind the scheme. Her goal is to overrun the world with her special, aggressive, fast-growing plants so that she can turn the Earth back to simpler times. It is up to the spies to weed-whack Shelly and save the planet. In the subplot, Clover and Mandy compete to be a spokesmodel.
153	23	"Danger TV" "Télé danger OK"	Grant Sauvé	October 2, 2013	February 8, 2015	153
When a kids' TV show celebrity is abducted on-air, the spies immediately investigate. And when they finally find the celebrity, they discover he's being forced to pull off a death-defying stunt in front of crowds of people against his will by the producer of a show called Danger TV, in which celebrities are forced to do crazy stunts against their will. Nothing is too dangerous for "Danger TV" as long as it gets ratings. In the end, the spies are run through a dangerous gauntlet while being broadcast live. In the subplot, Clover's cousin Norman comes to visit and Jerry is enlisted to babysit while the spies are on the mission.
154	24	"Solo Spies!" "Espionnes en solo"	Nicole Demerse	October 3, 2013	February 15, 2015	154
When Jerry informs Sam, Clover and Alex that they will no longer be working as a team of spies, but as solo agents instead, the girls are shocked. And soon find themselves on three separate missions investigating agents around the world who have been reported missing. And it does not take them long to discover that the missing agents have, in fact, been abducted—when they themselves are abducted too. What the spies soon realize, when they're brought to a kooky lair along with the other sequestered spies, is that a baddie named FanGirl is to blame. No longer satisfied with collecting action figures from her fave spy movies, TV shows and comic books, she has decided to take her fanaticism to a whole new level—by accumulating real life spies to add to her collection. It is up to the girls to not only save their fellow agents and defeat the villain, but to show Jerry that they work better as a team than as solo spies. In the subplot, Mandy takes over the spies' penthouse.
155	25	"So Totally Versailles! – Parts 1 & 2" "Totalement Versailles – Parties 1 & 2"	Michelle Lamoreaux & Robert Lamoreaux	June 19, 2013	February 22, 2015	155
156	26	"So Totally Versailles! – Parts 1 & 2" "Totalement Versailles – Parties 1 & 2"	Michelle Lamoreaux & Robert Lamoreaux	June 23, 2013	March 1, 2015	156
Sam, Clover, and Alex, along with the rest of Professor Plunkett's Fashion Design class, win a trip to Versailles Palace, where they will be guests at a fashion show, showcasing the outfits of Queen Marie Antoinette herself. When they get on the flight and their plane is nearly forced into the ocean as a result of Mandy's very heavy luggage, they have no choice but to get into spy mode, regardless of being told by Jerry they would not have to be doing any spying. Once they are in Versailles, things become hectic just as quickly. After the palace representative, Mr. Auguste, tells them to make themselves at home in their posh surroundings, Jerry breaks his promise and sends the girls to check out a break-in at the nearby Palais du Luxembourg. The super spies find a clue—what appears to be a missing key—as they return to Versailles and find the place under assault by a mysterious attacker. Sam, Clover, and Alex realize that something very strange is going on after the attacks in the Palace of Versailles. Not only were they attacked by a weird creature whose footprints are extremely odd, but they also soon discover that several students from their trip have also gone missing. After Jerry informs the girls that the missing key they discovered earlier is linked to Versailles itself, the spies flee from a palace statue that has come to life, as they are reunited with the rest of their class in a dungeon beneath the palace itself. Eventually they learn that Mr. Auguste used the stolen key to bring the statues at Versailles to life, so that he himself can become king. They must save themselves, their classmates, and the palace before it is too late. In the subplot, Mandy hits her head in a tree and she thinks that she is Marie Antoinette.

=== Season 7 (2023) ===
The seventh season of Totally Spies! was announced by French television network Gulli in a YouTube video posted by Totally Spies! YouTube channel on September 7, 2023. and premiered on May 12, 2024, in France. Season 7 premiered on Cartoon Network on November 4, 2024, in the United Kingdom and premiered on January 4, 2025, in the United States.

No. overall	No. in season	English Title French Title	Written by	Original release date (France)	United States air date	Prod. code
157	1	"Frankenpanda" "Pandapocalypse"	Jess Kedward & Kirsty Peart	May 12, 2024	January 4, 2025	157
The spies are relaxing on Malibu beach, where Clover states they have not gone on a mission all summer. She freaks out realizing her rhythmic skills have probably gone rusty and gets Alex to practice with her, only for all three of them to end up in a mess. Mandy mocks them before stealing their chair. The spies are WOOHPed, and are told to go to Singapore to stop an evil plot. They arrive at the port of Singapore to deal with a robot, but fail miserably. They decide to cheer up by getting some frozen yoghurt. The spies end up going to WOOHP World via Woohp-e, a flying car-pool service for WOOHP agents, where they acquaint themselves with their new co-workers Zerlina and Toby. They are presented their new outfits and gadgets. Later, a giant, discord-sowing panda robot arrives at the Waterfront Promenade of Marina Bay Sands, spraying frozen yogurt all over the place. The spies are able to neutralize it, helping the girl controlling it inside. Clover, Sam, and Alex are sent to WOOHP headquarters in Singapore to meet the agency's new director, Zerlina. As Jerry has retired, his daughter takes over and will be in charge of the spies from now on. Their first mission is to foil Captain Panda's plans to terrorize the city. But what a surprise when they discover that the investigator of this chaos is actually a little girl. There's no time to lose in convincing her to abandon her plan and restore calm to the neighborhood.
158	2	"It Takes a Slob" "Copie-compost"	Darin Henry	September 8, 2024	January 11, 2025	158
The streets of Singapore get spread with trash, and all indicators point to the Slob, who is already in prison. The spies will have to temporarily ally with the criminal queen of disorder to find her double criminal. In the subplot, Alex must get the apartment clean in time to impress her coach.
159	3	"Totally Talented" "Totalement talentueuses"	Chio Su-Ping	May 26, 2024	January 18, 2025	159
The trio and Glitterstar are invited to an event which brings together all the Internet's biggest celebrity stars, including a dancing hamster called Fluffypuff, Clover's favourite Internet personality. But nothing goes according to plan when Pink Ice, a manipulative social media influencer, joins the meeting and decides to steal all the talents of all the stars. Singers lose their voices, bakers get the ingredients wrong, and fans panic. Zerlina asks the Spies to go to Seoul in I-nov, a famous web convention to investigate. It's up to the Spies to intervene and restore order!
160	4	"Creepy Crawly Creature Catcher" "Invasion de grosses bestioles gluantes"	Robert Lamoreaux & Michelle Lamoreaux	June 2, 2024	January 25, 2025	160
Digital monsters from a video game called Creepy Crawly Creature Catcher, invade Singapore. To defeat them, the Spies must show tactical intelligence and avoid digital slime. At the end of the episode, the spies head to Gardens by the Bay for their celebration.
161	5	"Totally Vintage" "Espionnes à l'ancienne"	Ishai Ravid	June 23, 2024	February 1, 2025	161
A dubious toaster brought back by the spies infiltrates the WOOHP network and infects all connected household appliance devices. Thanks to vintage gadgets, they manage to find the villain, a bitter cook, and face his army of devices who have turned against their owners! In the subplot, Clover tries to overcome Sam's cooking, which she has a negative opinion about.
162	6	"It's Totally a Test" "Attention : ceci n'est pas un test"	Darin Henry	June 16, 2024	February 8, 2025	162
Toby warns the spies that they will soon have to take a WOOHP secret examination. Alex, who is preparing for the decathlon, is supercharged, but when a viking attacks the Singapore Museum of Arts and Science, the girls are no longer so sure if it's an exercise or not.
163	7	"Totally Trolling, Much?" "Quand c'est trop, c'est Troll !"	Anastasia Heinzl	May 19, 2024	February 15, 2025	163
At the National Stadium of Singapore, 2 gymnasts, the fantastic elastic sisters, perform an acrobatics routine. They win a trophy, but immediately start arguing over who deserves it more after being whispered into their ears. At Aiya Academy, Mei Lin is spray painting, but is dragged away by Alex who shares some news with her about Sam publishing her first game: Spy Mission. Sam leaves to meet the one who runs Game Me One blog in the library, and Clover and Alex tail her. They are all shocked to discover it's Mandy, which causes Sam to lose her temper. They go onto the field to relax, but get whooped instead. The spies investigate a disruption at a construction site in Tiong Bahru, where they stop 2 men from destroying surrounding buildings in their fight. Marco Lumiere, no longer in prison, runs his own studio in Singapore named after himself. He realized in prison that his evil schemes made him waste time being away from his family, and would rather spend that creating his own films and spending time with his daughter Shirley Lumiere. He is also seen to be somewhat successful, having his films be available at Aiya Academy, such as Revenge of the Bionic Guinea Pig. The spies meet his daughter in the storage where she reveals that her own film, like her father's initial ones, failed to impress, and she got mocked for it. She is a film student at AIYA Academy and decided to create strange trolls with hairy feet to troll her classmates for their mockery. She upgraded her father's old animatronics with AI chips so they could speak, and a transmitter receiver connected to a relay antenna. However, the trolls went out of control, invaded Singaporea ND showed discord among the residents, causing them to argue. Shirley assisted the spies in regaining their senses and stopping the animatronics. After all is said and done, she is remorseful about what took place and her father comforts her, being glad she is safe. He also lets her know that his initial films had catastrophic reviews, but that never stopped him from making them anyway. The most important thing was loving what he did.
164	8	"Mega Moon Cheese" "Fromage et lune de miel"	Nicole Demerse	June 9, 2024	February 22, 2025	164
WOOHP calls on the spies when a dissatisfied cheese manufacturer transforms the moon into cheese, threatening Paris and the world. Meanwhile, Clover tries to redeem herself after rejecting Mei Lin by accident.
165	9	"What Woolly Mammoth" "Pel'âge de glace"	Anastasia Heinzl	September 1, 2024	March 1, 2025	165
An obsession with knitting revives mammoths to become the queen of hand-knitted sweaters. The spies must act quickly to prevent the arrival of a new ice age, especially because of Alex's overcycling, Clover no longer has a single sweater!
166	10	"The Dah-Who?" "La chasse au dahu"	Juliette Bas	September 1, 2024	March 8, 2025	166
When several snowboarding champions go missing, the spies are sent on a mission to Switzerland alongside Blaine to infiltrate a competition. Mysterious legendary goats called the 'Dah-Who' are said to be behind it all, but how can they be stopped?
167	11	"Totally Pawsome" "Alerte chat-pardeurs"	Ishai Ravid	June 30, 2024	March 15, 2025	167
When villains disappear for no apparent reason, Clover suspects a shenanigan led by the cats of the bad guys. But before she can prove it, she is kidnapped by 3 kittens with the appearance of angels ready to do anything to infiltrate WOOHP.
168	12	"Undercover Supervillains" "Presque totalement méchantes"	Ishai Ravid	September 22, 2024	March 22, 2025	168
In order to foil a Machiavellian plan, the Spies must pose as super villains leading an army of henchmen. Alex discovers that she loves to indulge her dark side.
169	13	"Over-Simulated" "Un stage trop immersif"	Sian Ni Mhuiri	September 29, 2024	March 29, 2025	169
The Spies and Toby's training day is sabotaged.
170	14	"Mystery on the WOOHP Express" "Mystère à bord du Woohp Express"	Anastasia Heinzl	November 3, 2024	January 10, 2026	170
Britney returns to work with the spies - only for the mission to go wrong when Zerlina suddenly goes missing, leaving Jerry devastated.
171	15	"The Wild Life" "La grosse rata-trouille"	Darin Henry & Ursula Burton	November 10, 2024	January 17, 2026	171
The spies play camp counselors to stop a theft of precious natural resources in the Canadian wilderness, but a camper under their responsibility decides to venture alone into the woods. They find out that the baddie behind this was disguising as the camp manager the whole time, using a part of the forest to illegally grow enormous vegetables. In the subplot, Alex brings a spider home, but Clover becomes frightened of it.
172	16	"Stink-O-Rama" "Alerte pestilence"	Chio Su-Ping	October 6, 2024	January 24, 2026	172
The spies' ecological perspectives, and especially Alex's, are called into question when they find themselves face to face with the creator of walking durians who attack polluting factories in the Amazon, destroying everything in their path.
173	17	"Pumpkin Particle Peril" "La menace des citrouilles volantes"	Nicole Demerse	October 27, 2024	September 26, 2026	173
On the eve of Halloween, a space-time rift threatens to destroy LA by releasing pumpkin ghosts from another dimension onto its streets. Armed with their best disguises, the spies are ready to turn them into soup.
174	18	"Something's Fishy" "Anguille sous roche"	Valencia Parker	October 13, 2024	January 31, 2026	174
Something is turning AIYA upside down every night, and Zerlina goes undercover to investigate with the help of the Spies. But as the pressure mounts on Zerlina, the girls discover that having their boss as a teacher isn't as cool as they had hoped.
175	19	"Forever Liptastic" "Woohp là là"	Rebecca Hobbs	October 20, 2024	February 7, 2026	175
WOOHP organizes a fake wedding to catch the one who turns couples into statues on their big day. To avoid the same fate for Sam and Toby, who are playing the bride and groom, the spies must quickly identify the culprit among the guests.
176	20	"Terrible Toddler Toys" "Les abominables joujous"	Nicole Demerse	September 15, 2024	February 14, 2026	176
The spies must save Singapore, which is under siege by excited babies and their terrible chasm-creating toys. Behind this attack is Cyberchac, whose goal is to find WOOHP World by weakening the shield that protects it. Cyberchac nearly breaks into WOOHP World, but is thwarted by Sam at the last moment. Despite this, they still manage to get away.
177	21	"Mandy's Mind-Blowing Mainframe" "Le monde de Mandy"	Nicole Demerse	August 27, 2025	February 21, 2026	177
Sam and Glitterstar get stuck inside Mandy's computer and a vending machine. They are surrounded by dangerous artificial Mandy clones in a digital world where everything is purple (and Mandy-related). So it's up to the other two Spies to rescue their friends and bring them back to the real world, otherwise they will all be trapped in it forever.
178	22	"A Dog Gone Day" "Toutou mais pas ça"	Jess Kedward & Kirsty Peart	October 1, 2025	February 28, 2026	178
During a royal mission, Sam switches bodies with Jerry's dog Poochie-Poo.
179	23	"Glitterspy" "Mission Mei Lin"	Ishai Ravid	October 8, 2025	March 7, 2026	179
A villain called the Curator puts the trio's friend Glitterstar in danger all because of speculation that she is hiding a mysterious pearl. The spies have been arrested by the villain, so Glitterstar must team up with Toby to rescue them. Note: As of this episode, Glitterstar is aware of the trio's secret spy life. But her memory gets erased at the end of the episode.
180	24	"Oldies and Goodies" "Espionnes en tournée"	Ashley Mendoza & Elizabeth Schub Kamir	October 15, 2025	March 14, 2026	180
Sam must overcome her stage fright when she's chosen to sing for Earth Day.
181	25	"Locked in Space" "Coup de tonnerre sur le Woohp"	Jess Kedward & Kirsty Peart	October 22, 2025	March 21, 2026	181
The spies have been arrested and sent to WOOHP's Space Jail for something they may or may not have done: stealing a microchip of global importance. As Toby helps them escape to prove their innocence, a criminal called the Weatherman secretly escapes too.
182	26	"Cyber Sweetheart" "Cœurs de pierres"	Jess Kedward & Kirsty Peart	November 15, 2025	March 28, 2026	182
Thinking life is back to normal, the spies are shocked to discover that Cyberchac has taken over WOOHP World and has sent Zerlina and Jerry to Space Jail. Therefore, they have to team up with Toby and an unlikely acquaintance to defeat Cyberchac and rescue their allies.

=== Season 8 (2026) ===
The series has been renewed for an eighth season on June 13, 2024 and premiered in August 26, 2026, in France.

No. overall	No. in season	English Title French Title	Written by	Original release date (France)	United States air date	Prod. code
183	1	"Twisted Sister" "Sœur-price"	Unknown	August 26, 2026	TBA	TBA
There's a bizarre theft spree in NYC and it seems the lighting-fast culprit has ties to WOOHP World voss Zerlina! Meanwhile, Alex panics about being Zerlina's golf partner, and Toby battles a malfunctioning WOOHP-R.
184	2	"Total Role Reversal" "On a échangé nos missions"	Ishai Ravid	August 19, 2026 (M6+) (as avant premiere)	TBA	TBA
A new WOOHP directive swaps agents and staff: the Spies run HQ while their bosses face a villain with a comet magnet! Chaos ensues as roles clash, a comet threatens Earth, and Glitterstar's drone bedazzling spree causes unexpected trouble!
185	3	"Rent-A-Lair" "Un mère-veilleux cadeau"	Jess Kedward & Kirsty Peart	September 30, 2026	TBA	TBA
It's Stella's birthday, and the Spies' moms fake a mission to spend time with their daughters—only the lair turns out to be real and the villains turns up! Meanwhile, Toby's teaching guitar to Zerlina and Clover scrambles for a last-minute gift!
186	4	"Diva Fever" "Divattitude"	Unknown	September 23, 2026	TBA	TBA
Alternative hair stylist Signore Splendore is ridiculed for his boring showcase in Venice, so he creates wigs that are ultra-incredible—but they have a mind of their own, turning wearers into Divas! Meanwhile, Clover's influencer moment spirals when Glitterstar's look fails, forcing her to use a wig... Uh oh—enter Diva Glitterstar, causing chaos at the boba café!
187	5	"Mellow Much?" "Totalement ramollos..."	Unknown	September 16, 2026	TBA	TBA
Supervillains are acting oddly mellow, leading the Spies undercover at a Bali resort and to a villain's rage-extracting machine. Sam falls victim and becomes super chilled but Glitterstar transforms into a rage-filled monster!
188	6	"Costume Catastrophe" "La revanche des moustique"	Unknown	September 9, 2026	TBA	TBA
Can the Spies stop a scientist and his swarm of human-mosquito hybrids taking over Singapore? This is officially Clover's WORST DAY EVER: Mandy's bossing her, she's turning buggy in class, and costume date night with Marcus is in jeopardy!
189	7	"Rise of the Queen of Queso Blanco" "Alerte éruption de Fromage Fondu"	TBA	November 4, 2026	TBA	TBA
A copycat cheesemaker turns a volcano into queso, threatening Mexico! With Sam sick, Zerlina sends ex-WOOHP prisoner Jacques Montague as her replacement, while Toby babysits Sam. Can the Spies stop a cheesy disaster with this convict in tow?
190	8	"A Tyrannosaurus Wreck" "Panique jurassique"	Unknown	October 14, 2026	TBA	TBA
When stuntman Tuff McBull brings an extinct T-Rex back to life, the Spies must stop him before he turns L.A. into a dino disaster. Meanwhile, Toby calls in a CODE RED when his Grandpa goes missing on a planned day out.
191	9	"Zero Sam Game" "Copie conforme... ou presque"	Unknown	October 21, 2026	TBA	TBA
Toby creates AI replicas of the Spies while they take a break. But they go rogue, teaming up with an infamous gamer, throwing Singapore into chaos. The Spies camping trip out the worst elements of their characters.
192	10	"Roar" "Pas de danse"	Unknown	September 2, 2026	TBA	TBA
When a famous Lion Dancer goes missing, the Spies go undercover in the dance troupe to find out if it's an inside job. Meanwhile, Sam is studying so hard she turns down tickets to their favourite K-pop band with huge regrets!
193	11	TBA	TBA	TBA	TBA	TBA
194	12	"Inside Job Much?" "Intrusion au Woohp"	Unknown	October 7, 2026	TBA	TBA
On the eve of the WOOHP Leadership Conference, drones go rogue, Zerlina's emo, and the Spies are banished! Lex Stealth, Zerlina's ex-frenemy, is impersonating her! Meanwhile, Chee's “spy training” feels more like spring cleaning – will it work?
195	13	"Homecoming"	TBA	TBA	TBA	TBA
The Spies are sent back to their high school in Beverly Hills to stop creepy mannequins from bringing back mall culture. Clover struggles to let go of the past and find her place in today's high school social life.
196	14	"Le roi de la plage"	TBA	October 28, 2026	TBA	TBA
197	15	TBA	TBA	TBA	TBA	TBA
198	16	TBA	TBA	TBA	TBA	TBA
199	17	TBA	TBA	TBA	TBA	TBA
200	18	TBA	TBA	TBA	TBA	TBA
201	19	TBA	TBA	TBA	TBA	TBA
202	20	TBA	TBA	TBA	TBA	TBA
203	21	TBA	TBA	TBA	TBA	TBA
204	22	TBA	TBA	TBA	TBA	TBA
205	23	TBA	TBA	TBA	TBA	TBA
206	24	TBA	TBA	TBA	TBA	TBA
207	25	TBA	TBA	TBA	TBA	TBA
208	26	TBA	TBA	TBA	TBA	TBA

== See also ==
- Totally Spies!
- Totally Spies! The Movie
