= Scratching post =

Object for cats to relieve skin irritation

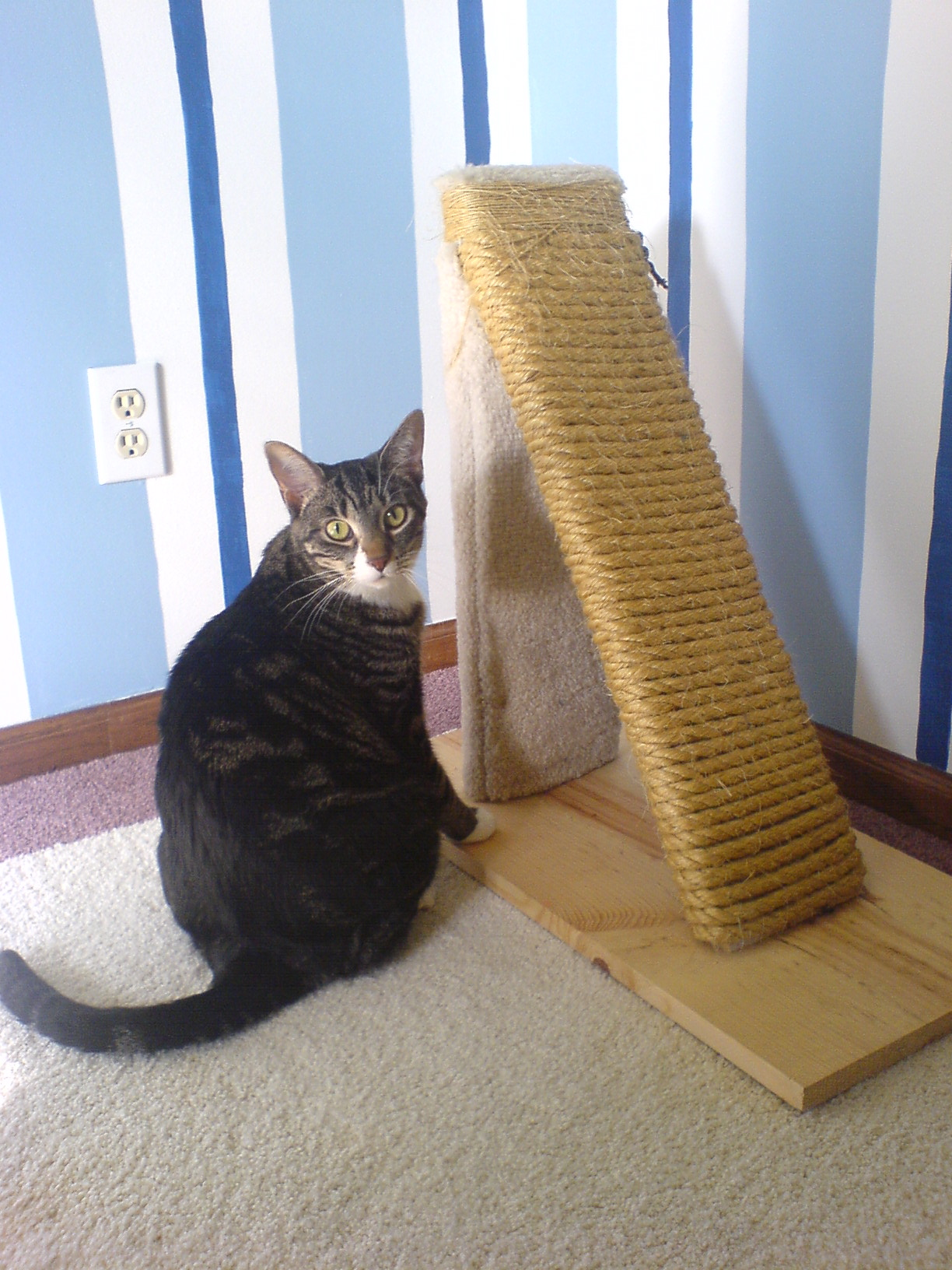
A homemade scratching post

A scratching post is a wooden post covered in rough material that cat owners provide so their pets have an acceptable place to scratch. The most common type consists of a wooden post, roughly 60–90 cm (24–35 in) tall, covered in rough fabric or sisal. The post is mounted vertically in a wide base, which allows the cat to stretch upward on its rear legs and scratch freely without tipping it over. A post that is unstable or does not allow a cat to fully extend its body might put off the cat from using it. Surfaces vary: the post may be covered in sisal rope, upholstery fabric, the jute backing of a piece of carpet, or sections of corrugated cardboard.

Many pet owners say they have to experiment with different surfaces to find one that their cats will scratch reliably. Matt Wildman, a cat behaviorist, explained that sisal or corrugated cardboard surfaces are favored by most cats. Other kinds of scratching posts are more elaborate, with several levels of horizontal platforms for climbing and cozy cave-like areas where cats may hide. Very tall ones are often called "cat trees." These may have a vertical tension rod that extends to the ceiling to provide extra stability.

== Why cats scratch ==
Cats have a natural urge to scratch. As cats are predators it is a reflex for them to sharpen their claws. Other functional reasons they do it include removing the outer sheath of the nail, exercising the muscles of the paws, and stretching. Scratching is also a social outlet for cats that facilitates communication. Cats have scent glands in their paws, allowing them to leave their scents and pheromones on surfaces to mark territory.

== Gallery ==
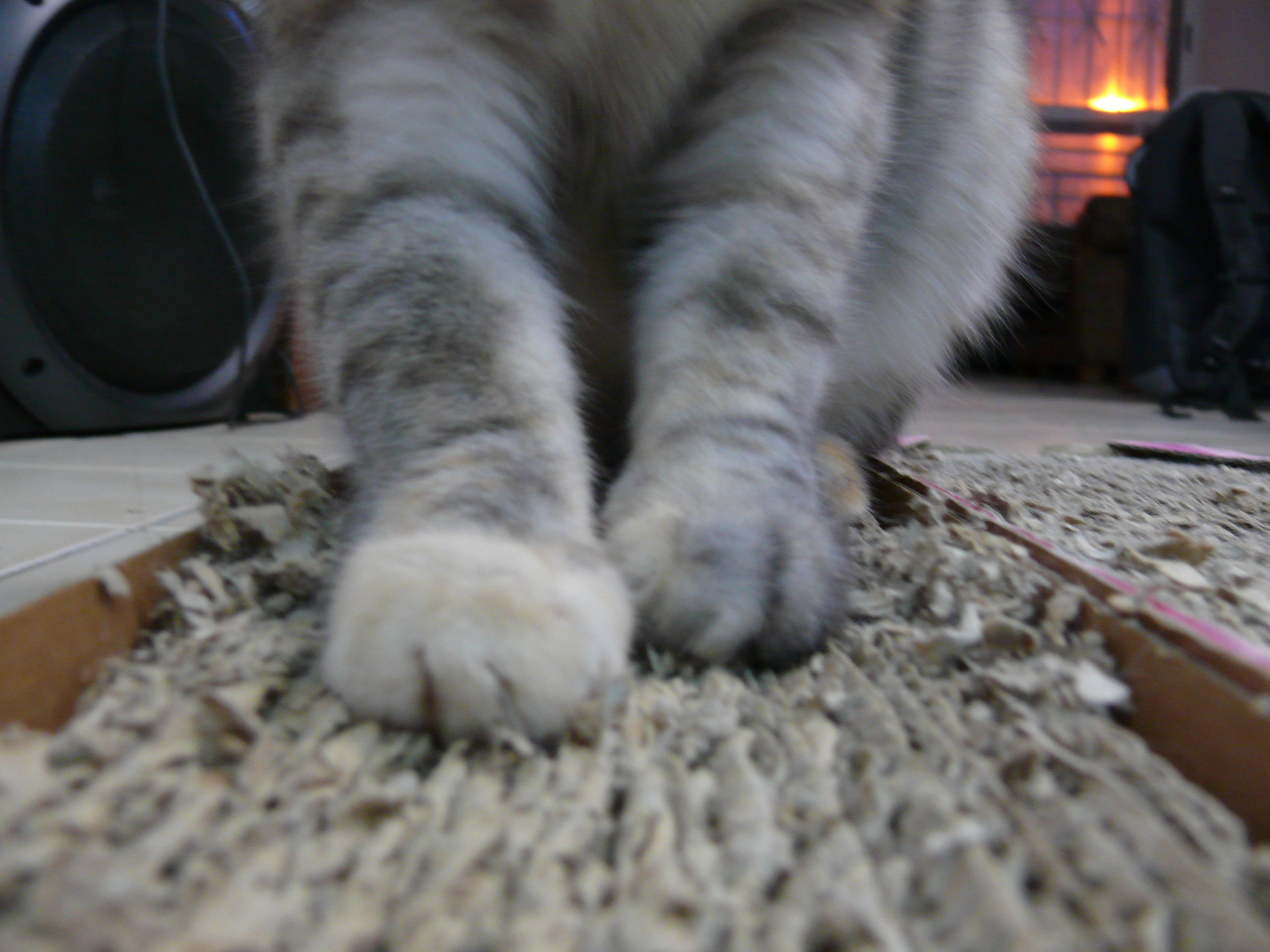
A corrugated fiberboard scratching pad

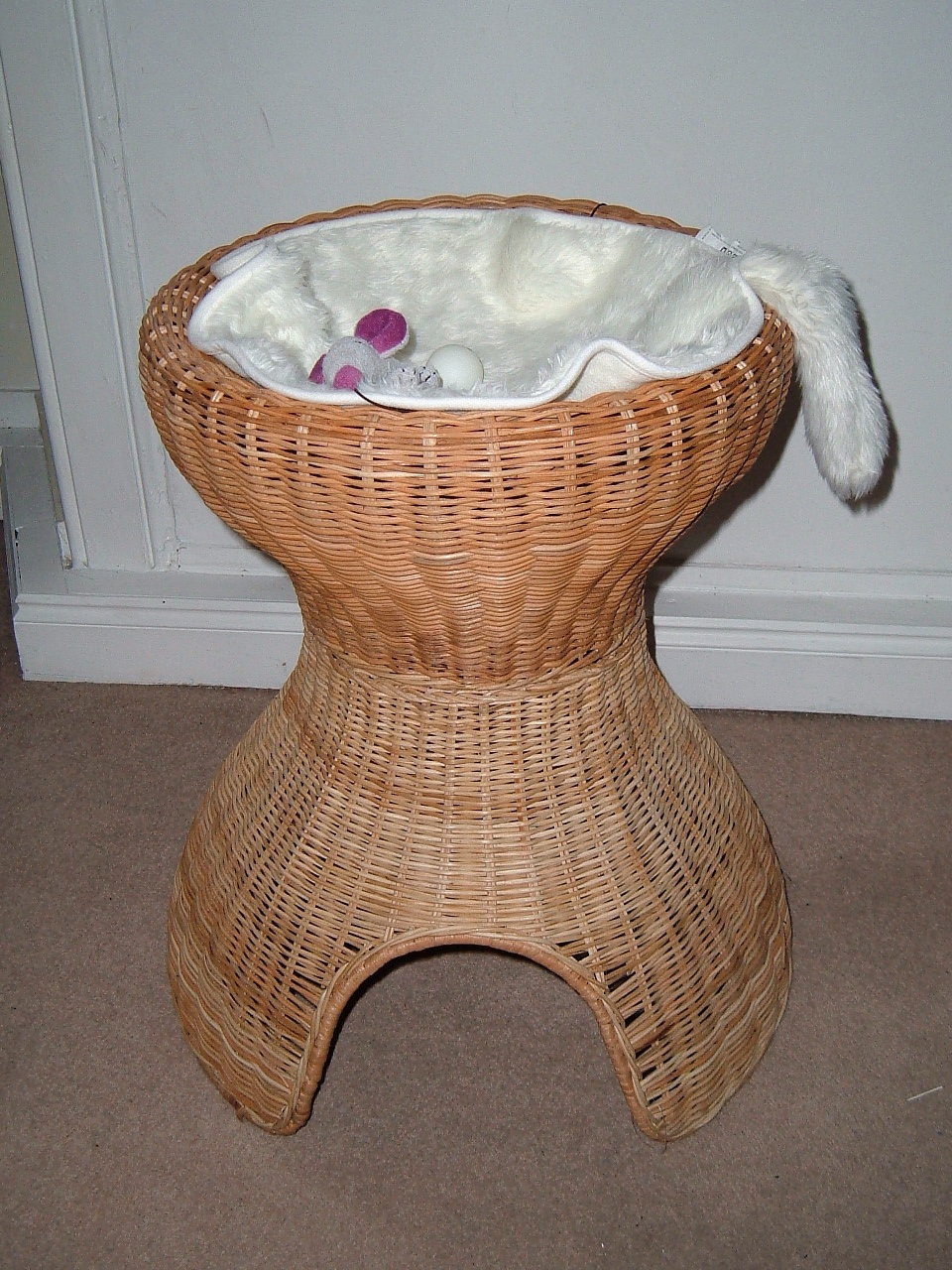
A wickerwork cat pole

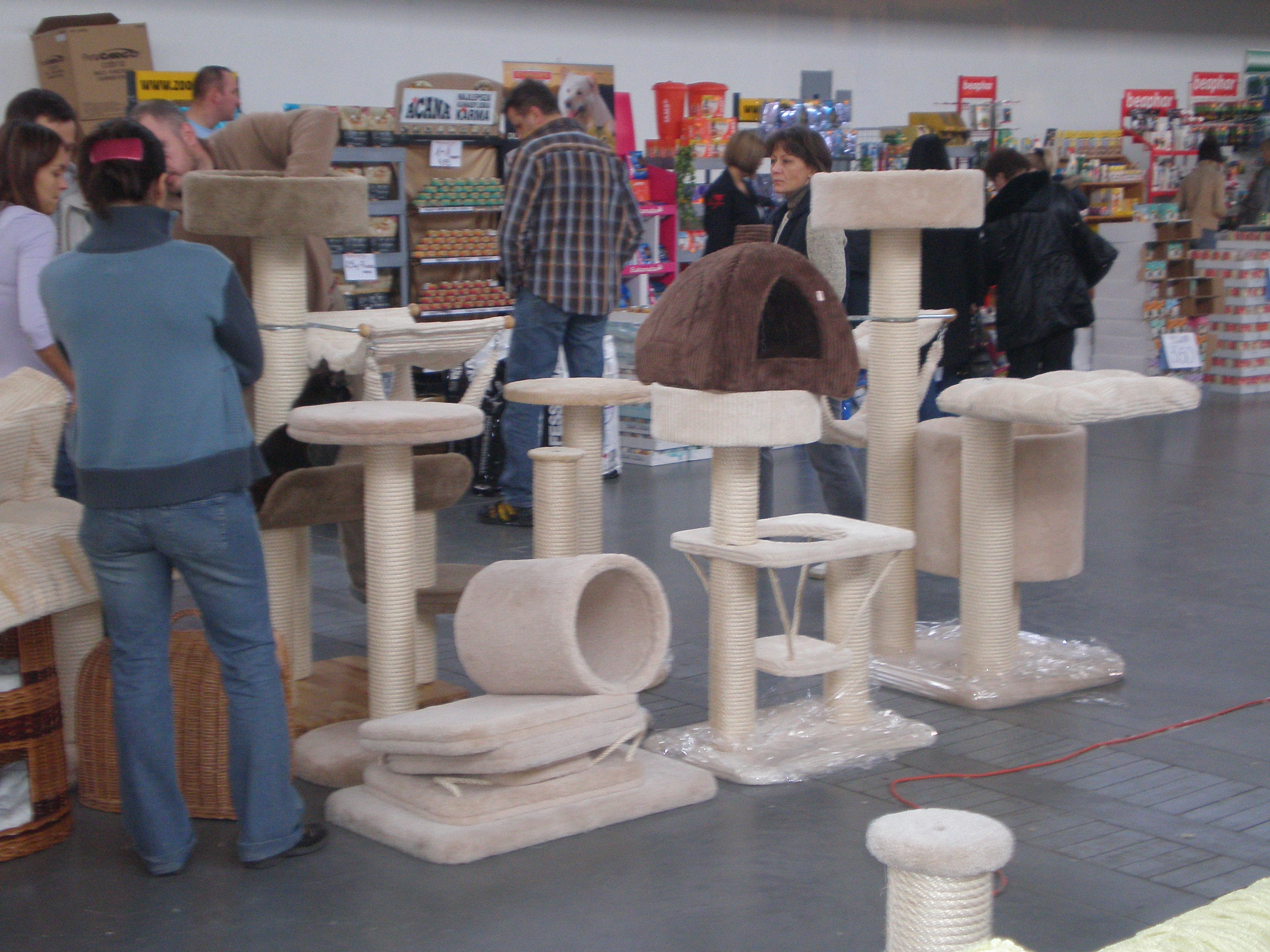
A variety of scratching posts for sale at a cat show

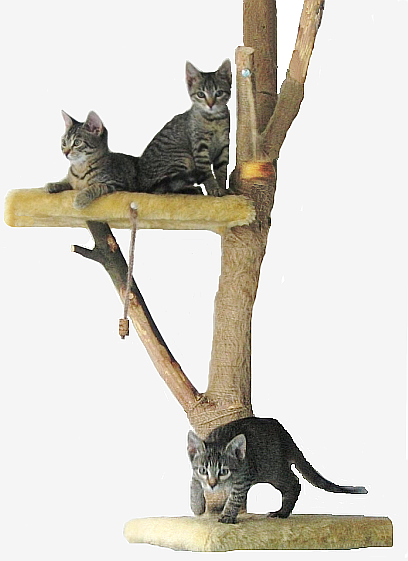
An actual tree trunk used as a scratching post

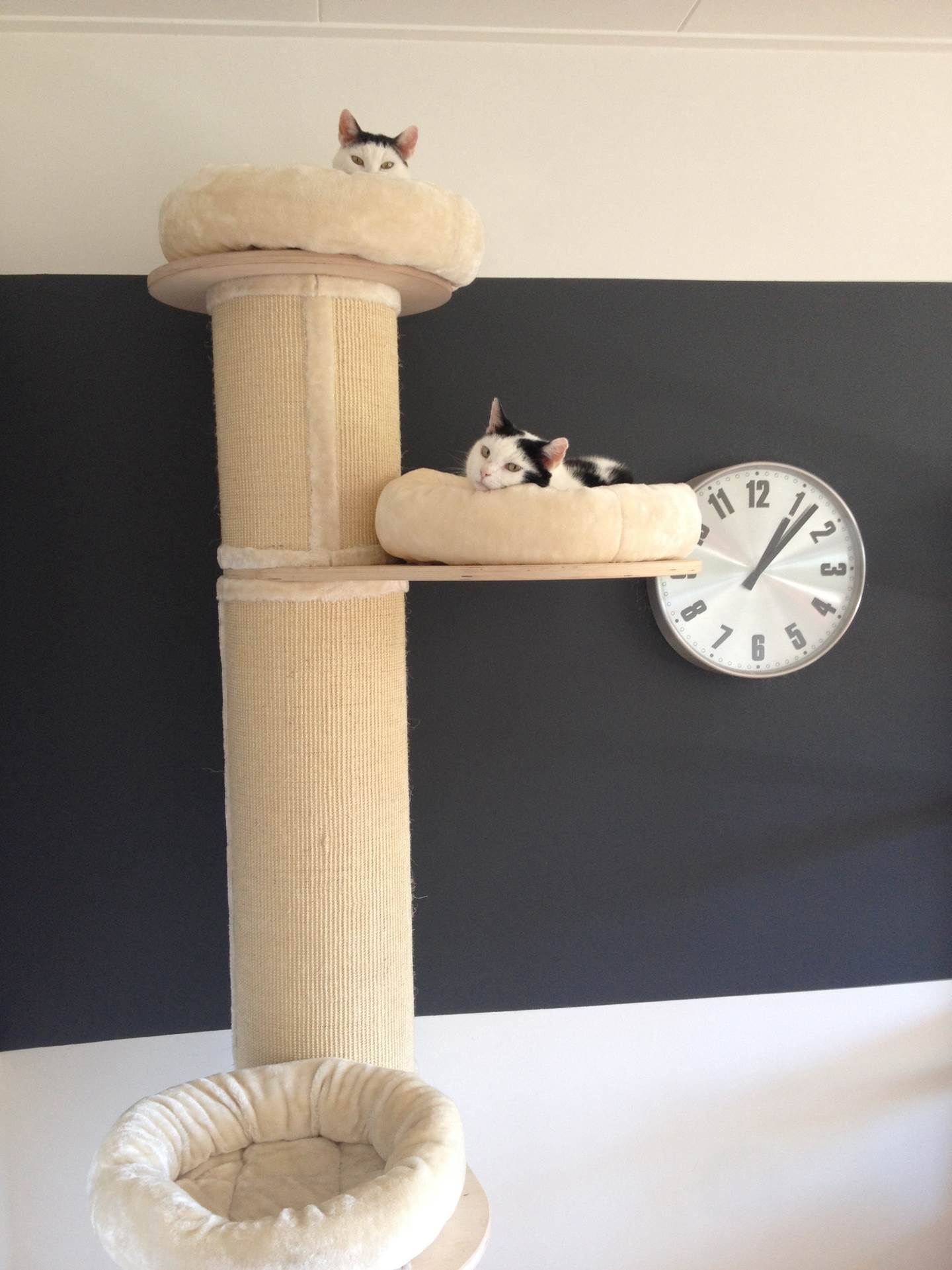
Cat tree with 2 cats

== See also ==
- Cat tree
