= Cat tree =

Artificial structure for cats

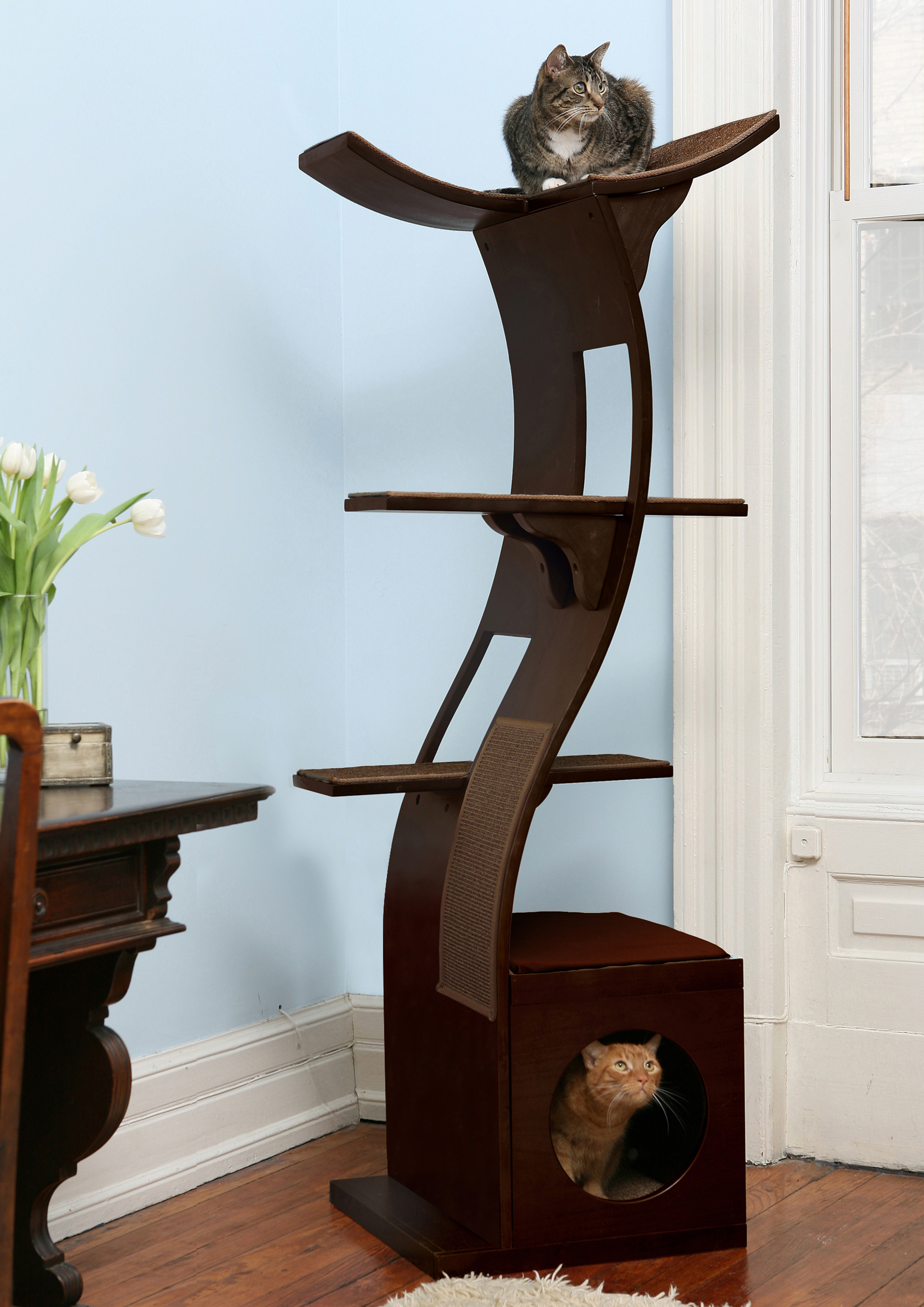
Modern designed Lotus Cat Tree

A cat tree (also referred to as a cat house, cat condo, kitty condo, or cat tower) is an artificial structure for a cat to play, exercise, relax and sleep on.

Cat trees vary in height and complexity, with most cats preferring features offering height over comfort, particularly if tall enough to allow a clear survey of their territory. Some cats prefer options which offer shelter or a secluded escape, which may be at any height of the structure.

Conventional cat tree designs are of a floor-based solid structure, composed of square-shaped sheets of particle board (as platforms, boxes and enclosed structures) combined with wooden studs and planks (used as elevators or stairs), with exteriors and interiors typically covered with carpet. Elevators are also frequently covered with an abrasive materials (sisal rope being the most common), intended to induce cats to scratch in those areas and reduce overall wear of the structure. The levels created by the layer of interactive features offer cats anything from bedding and shelter to exercise and play.

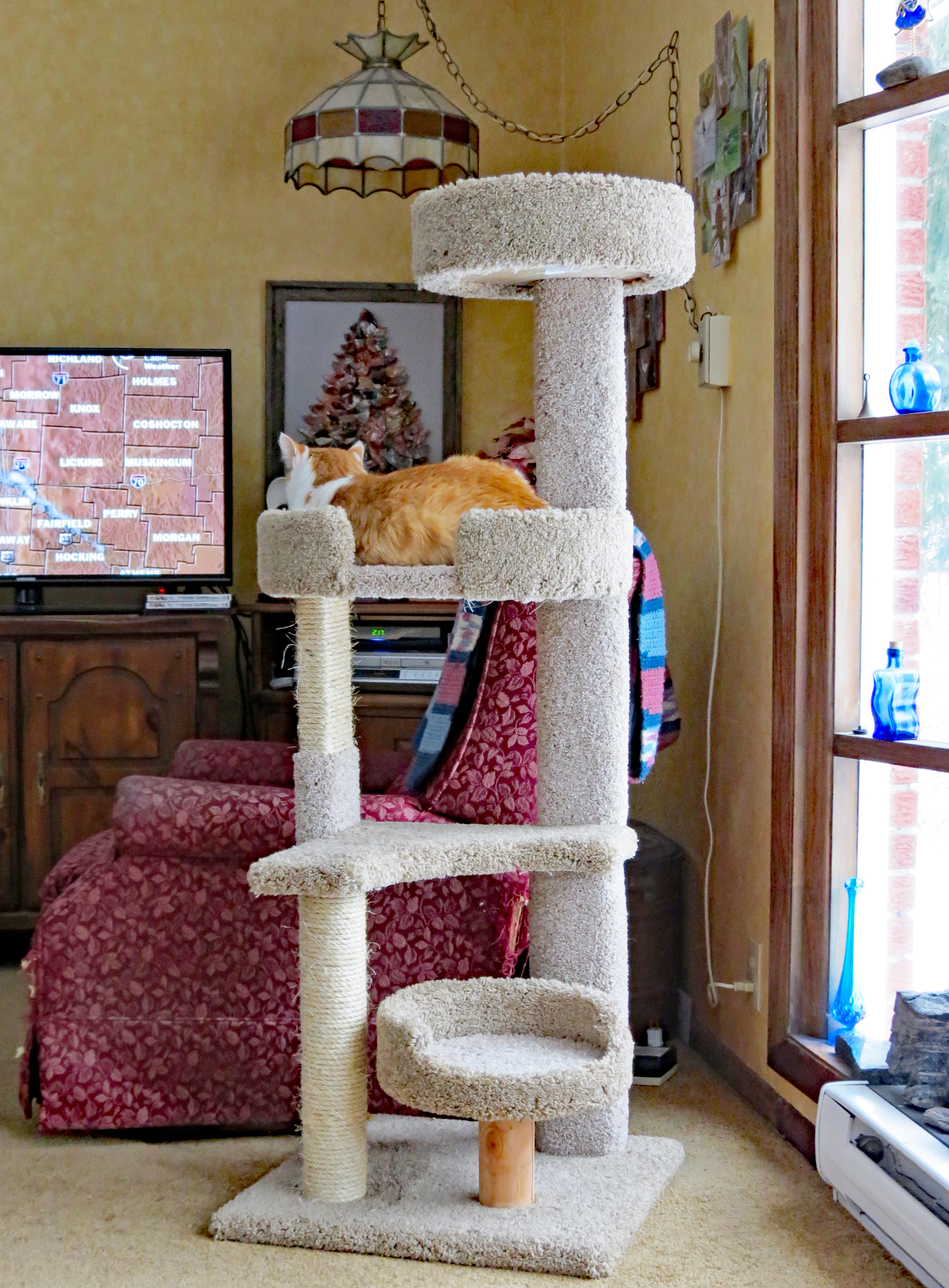
A more traditional cat tree made of carpet and sisal rope

There are specialized alternatives to the traditional cat tree that offer improved function for cats. These alternative designs include wall-mounted pieces and sets, as well as ergonomic designs and geometries that contour to feline anatomy. Some designs simulate the shape or appearance of real trees. Soft textiles and heavyweight fabrics have also replaced abrasive carpet in some of the more luxury-themed designs.

Cat trees are meant to offer cats a sense of security, by creating interactive areas that are only used by them. While cat trees can help to deter cats from scratching on other furniture, not every cat will react the same and cat owners have reported varied results in that regard.

Some companies are developing modern cat trees in stylish designs. These cat trees combine the functions cats need, such as stepped platforms and height, with more visually appealing design such as exposed wood. This more modern cat furniture is constructed to match a home's décor.
