= Totally Spies! The Movie =

2009 film by Pascal Jardin

- French theatrical release poster
- French: Totally Spies! Le film
- Directed by: Pascal Jardin
- Written by: Michelle Lamoreaux; Robert Lamoreaux
- Based on: Totally Spies! by: Vincent Chalvon-Demersay; David Michel
- Produced by: Vincent Chalvon-Demersay; David Michel
- Starring: Claire Guyot; Fily Keita; Celine Mauge; Jean-Claude Donda; Karl Lagerfeld
- Edited by: Rodolphe Ploquin
- Music by: Paul-Étienne Côté; Maxime Barzel
- Production companies: Marathon Media; Studio 37; Mikado Film; Groupe Un
- Distributed by: Mars Distribution
- Release dates: 28 June 2009 (Grand Rex); 22 July 2009 (France)
- Running time: 84 minutes
- Countries: France; Italy
- Language: French
- Budget: €5 million
- Box office: $1.3 million

Totally Spies! The Movie (French: Totally Spies! Le film) is a 2009 animated spy-action film directed by Pascal Jardin and written by Robert and Michelle Lamoreaux. A French-Italian co-production, it is an adaptation of the TF1's animated television series Totally Spies! created by Vincent Chalvon-Demersay and David Michel.

The film is a prequel to the television series and covers how the girls first met and shows how they became spies for the World Organization of Human Protection (WOOHP). It stars the voices of the original French and English casts of the television series, while the former version also features the voice of German fashion designer Karl Lagerfeld as the main antagonist. It is the first theatrical film based on a TF1's TFOU animated series.

Totally Spies! The Movie premiered at the Grand Rex on 28 June 2009, and was released in France on 22 July 2009 by Mars Distribution. It received mixed reviews from critics, and was considered a box-office disappointment in France. Despite being released theatrically in some European territories, the film was mostly released direct-to-television internationally, including on Cartoon Network in the United States.

== Plot ==
Teenagers Clover, Sam, and Alex move to Beverly Hills, California. Their paths cross outside a sushi restaurant, where WOOHP agents purposely cause the giant roll above the entrance to break off and chase after them, setting nearby animals free outside of a pet store in the process. Alex saves an American Landrace piglet (which she later adopts and name "Oinky"), and the girls destroy the roll before it causes any damage. The girls later see each other again at their new school and meet their rivals, Mandy, Dominique and Caitlin. The girls eventually find themselves sucked in through a locker and into one of the offices of WOOHP. There, Jerry Lewis reveals that WOOHP had been secretly observing the trio since childhood and picked them as prime recruits for the organization. The girls refuse to join WOOHP, but later are "forced" into training after each having traumatic experiences that seemingly relate to WOOHP. In 48 hours, they complete their training.

They girls are thrown into their first mission when famous celebrities, including animal psychologist Peppy Wolfman, are abducted. They girls go to Wolfman's building where Alex has Oinky "go hog wild" as a distraction. The trio finds that each celebrity went through a makeover by a machine called the "Fabulizor", discovered thanks to security footage in Wolfman's office.

The girls later see that everyone at school also had gone through the Fabulizor, having the same look the next day. Oinky also ends up going through the Fabulizor. This is after nearly being blasted by one of the bad guy's minions in a fighter jet while being flown back to school. Tailing Mandy that night, they find that all of those who went through the Fabulizor became hypnotized by a chip in their cheekbones prior to the makeover. Alex spots Oinky behind the crowd and grabs onto him. Clover and Sam grab onto Alex as they get abducted into a space station.

There, the girls meet the mastermind behind the entire affair, Fabu, a model who lost fame on the runway and was ashamed of being an outsider during childhood. The spies are eventually captured by Fabu's henchmen. Fabu plans to abduct everyone who went through the Fabulizor and place them inside space station "Fabutopia" to live out new lives in the posh surroundings, then use a missile to destroy Earth. Fabu uses his Fabulizor in reverse and gives the girls horrible makeovers. He then sets them to be blasted back to Earth in rockets. Meanwhile, WOOHP agent Tad refuses to save the girls, planning to stop Fabu himself, take all the credit and regain his "favorite agent" status with Jerry.

After a fight with Fabu, however, Tad is strapped to the missile bound for Earth. The girls escape and, after fixing the Fabulizor's damage to themselves, go after Fabu. They cannot stop the missile from taking off but hitch a ride as it is rocketing towards Earth. They manage to turn the missile around to destroy the station. They then are picked up by Jerry in one of WOOHP's ships and rescue the kidnapped people from aboard the station (freeing them of the hypnotic trance by destroying Fabu's signal beacon) and evacuate safely, before the missile destroys the station. They then destroy Fabu's ship and catch him and his Sphynx in his escape pod.

The girls later accept their position as spies. They return to school to face punishment from principal Miss Skritch for the "damage" they caused when trying to avoid her earlier. But there, they realize that thanks to WOOHP, Miss Skritch was transferred to another school in Siberia as punishment by the Beverly Hills school district for child abuse. Fabu, Yuri and Tad are later imprisoned and set for punishment by WOOHP, and everyone who was rescued from aboard Fabu's space station have their minds erased (including Mandy). The girls are later notified of another mission. They bring up personal appointments but soon find themselves running from a WOOHP jet as it prepares to suck them aboard. The girls eventually change into their spy uniforms and go on the mission.

== Voice cast ==
=== Original French cast ===
- Fily Keita as Clover
- Claire Guyot as Sam
- Celine Mauge as Alex and Mandy
- Jean-Claude Donda as Jerry Lewis
- Karl Lagerfeld as Fabu
- Emmanuel Garijo as Tad
- Perrette Pradier as Madame Scritch
- Thierry Mercier as Peppy Garou
- Donald Reignoux as Rob Idole
- Antoine Tomé as Yuri

=== English cast ===
- Andrea Baker as Clover
- Jennifer Hale as Sam and Mandy
- Katie Griffin as Alex
- Adrian Truss as Jerry Lewis
- Joris Jarsky as Fabu
- Jay Schramek as Tad
- Barbara Budd as Mrs. Scritch
- Walker Boone as Peppy Wolfman
- Lyon Smith as Rob Hearthrob
- Jason Gray as Yuri

== Production ==
According to co-creator David Michel, the decision to produce a feature film was partly prompted by requests from fans and by the opportunity to depict the previously untold origins of Sam, Clover and Alex as spies. The filmmakers also had greater creative freedom than on the television series.

Pre-production, including storyboarding, character work and colour references, was carried out in Paris, while more than 250 people worked on the animation in Seoul. The production team used the theatrical format to increase the level of detail in lighting, shadows, character close-ups and colours compared with the television series.

Director Pascal Jardin cited the James Bond and Charlie's Angels franchises as influences on the film's fast-paced combination of action and comedy. Producer David Michel explained that the storyline concerning characters being transformed into physically idealised versions of themselves was intended to address themes of appearance and conformity among teenagers.

Jardin explained that the film combined traditional hand-drawn animation with digital techniques. The drawings were scanned, coloured digitally and composited using Adobe After Effects, while flying vehicles and spacecraft were created using 3D computer graphics. Final compositing and visual effects were completed in Paris, including motion blur, backlighting and lighting effects designed to enhance the film's visual presentation.

According to musical director Jennifer McCann, the soundtrack was designed to retain the television series' pop-oriented musical identity while introducing more orchestral compositions for the theatrical format. The score drew inspiration from the work of John Williams, John Barry, Lalo Schifrin and Ennio Morricone, combining these influences with electronic music, R&B, pop-rock and songs from the 1980s.

== Release ==
French teaser poster.

=== Theatrical ===
Totally Spies! The Movie premiered at the Grand Rex cinema in Paris on 28 June 2009. It was released theatrically in France on 22 July 2009 by Mars Distribution, opening in 272 cinemas. The film was released theatrically in the Netherlands on 14 October 2009, featuring a Dutch-language dub. In Turkey, it opened on 23 October 2009 under the title Casus Kızlar, distributed by UIP Türkiye. A Belgian theatrical release followed on 30 October 2009, distributed by Les Films de l'Elysée.

=== Home media ===
The film was released on DVD in France by Pathé Vidéo on 3 February 2010. In the Netherlands, the film was released on DVD by Warner Home Video under the title Totally Spies! De Film, featuring Dutch and French audio. In Italy, Totally Spies! – Il film was released on Blu-ray on 6 December 2011. In Brazil, the film received a DVD classification in March 2012, with California Filmes identified as its distributor.

=== Television ===
In the United States, the film premiered on Cartoon Network on 25 April 2010. In France, the film aired on Disney Cinemagic on 9 September 2011 and received its terrestrial television premiere on TF1 on 21 November 2012.

== Reception ==
=== Box office ===
The film grossed $572,000 on the first weekend and ranked at number #9 at the French box office with approximately $2,100 per theater. The gross for the second, third, and fourth weekends were $191,000, $89,106 and $29,083 respectively. The film grossed $1.3 million internationally.

=== Critical response ===
On AlloCiné, the film received an average rating of 2.7 out of 5 from nine French press reviews. Isabelle Regnier of Le Monde regarded the film as primarily aimed at preadolescent audiences, criticizing its simple, brightly coloured visual style while noting its humorous observations of Californian society.

In October 2025, Hannah Collins of JustWatch included Totally Spies! The Movie among ten films recommended to viewers of KPop Demon Hunters, highlighting its female-led action, humour and portrayal of friendship, as well as its nostalgic appeal to millennial audiences.

=== Accolades ===
Year	Award	Category	Outcome	Ref
2011	Kidscreen Awards	Best TV Movie	Won	
