= Fear of mice and rats =

Specific phobia towards mouses and rats

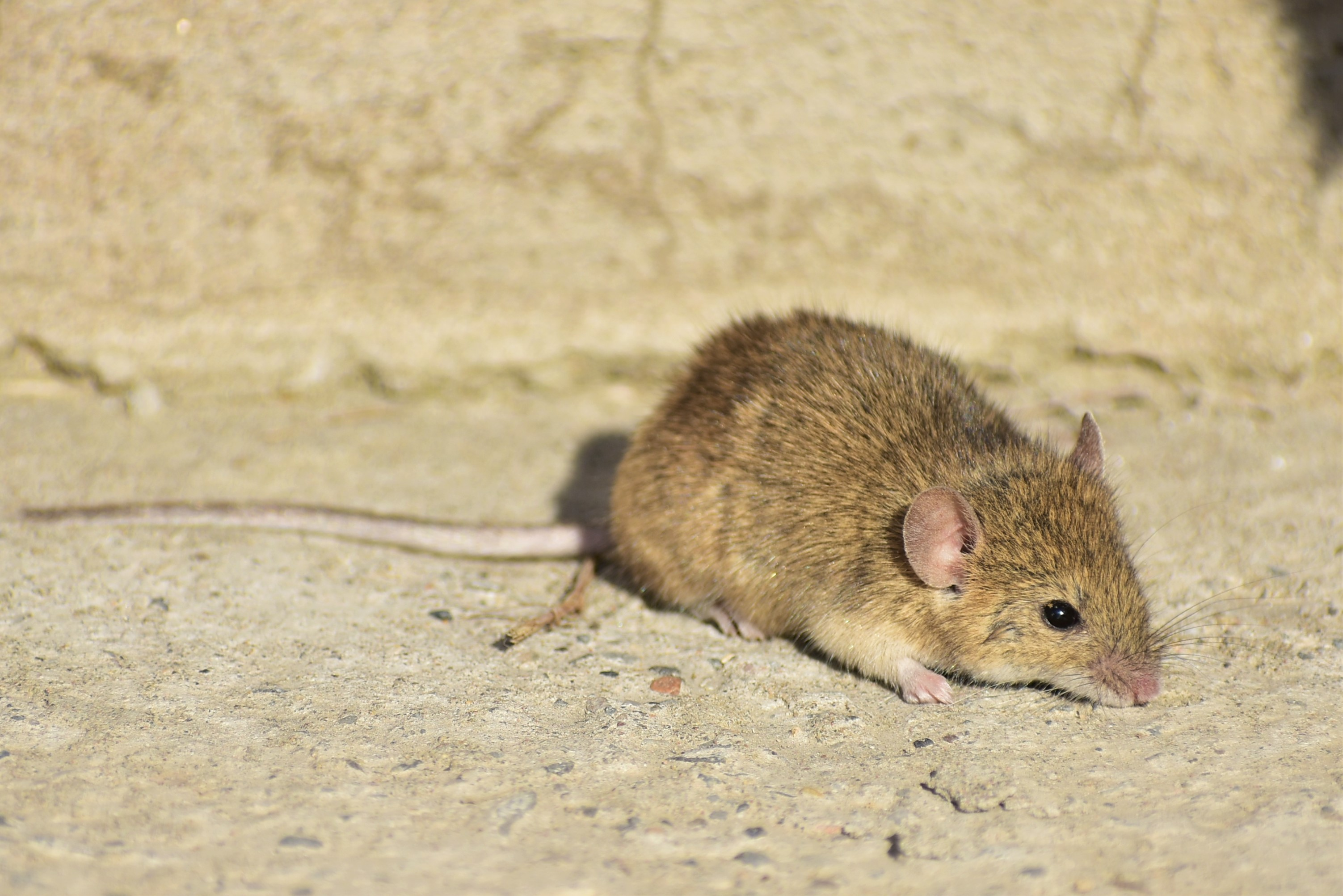
A house mouse (Mus musculus)

Fear of mice and rats is one of the most common specific phobias. It is sometimes referred to as musophobia (from Greek μῦς "mouse") or murophobia (a coinage from the taxonomic adjective "murine" for the family Muridae that encompasses mice and rats, and also Latin mure "mouse/rat"), or as suriphobia, from French souris, "mouse".

The phobia, as an unreasonable and disproportionate fear, is distinct from reasonable concern about rats and mice contaminating food supplies, which may potentially be universal to all times, places, and cultures where stored grain attracts rodents, which then consume or contaminate the food supply.

== Cause ==
In many cases a phobic fear of mice is a socially induced conditioned response, combined with (and originated in) the startle response (a response to an unexpected stimulus) common in many animals, including humans, rather than a real disorder. At the same time, as is common with specific phobias, an occasional fright may give rise to abnormal anxiety that requires treatment.

== Treatment ==
Fear of mice may be treated by any standard treatment for specific phobias. The standard treatment of animal phobia is systematic desensitization, and this can be done in the consulting room, or in hypnosis. Some clinicians use a combination of both approaches to desensitization during treatment. It can be helpful to encourage patients to experience some positive associations with mice: the feared stimulus is paired with the positive rather than being continuously reinforced by the negative.

== Elephants and mice ==
There is a common folklore belief that elephants are afraid of mice. The earliest reference to this claim is probably by Pliny the Elder in his Naturalis Historia, book VIII. As translated by Philemon Holland (1601), "Of all other living creatures, they [elephants] cannot abide a mouse or a rat." Numerous zoos and zoologists have shown that elephants can be conditioned not to react. MythBusters performed an experiment in which, indeed, multiple elephants did attempt to avoid a mouse, showing there may be some basis for this belief. Regardless, elephantine musophobia remains the basis of various jokes and metaphors. The classical board game dou shou qi has the rat kill an elephant, and multiple editions of the rule book mentions that the rat would crawl into the elephant's ears to gnaw into its brain. This is considered to be a folk tale.

== Patron saint ==
Gertrude of Nivelles is the patron saint of murophobia, and is also invoked against rats and mice in general.

== In popular culture ==
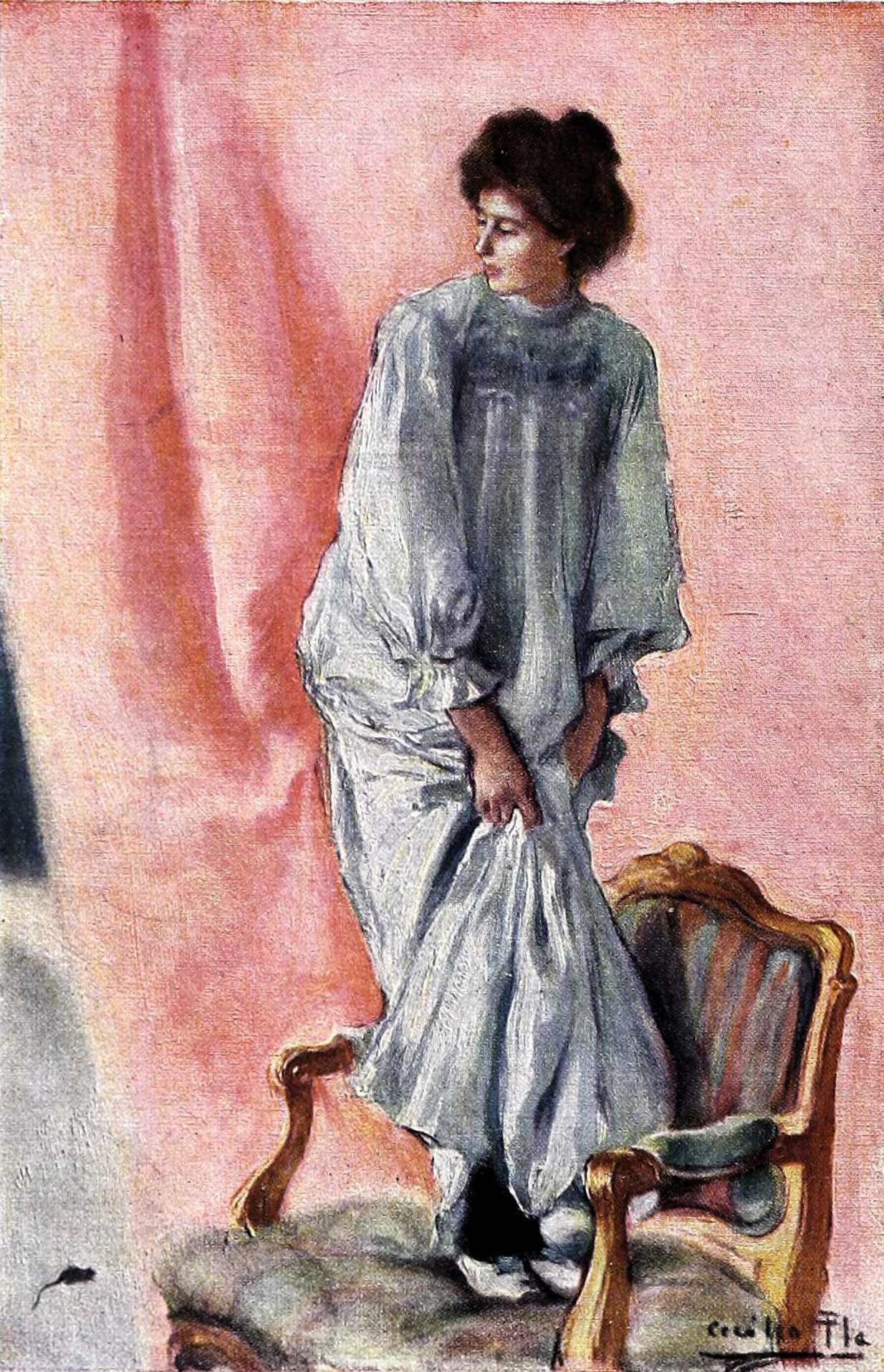
Woman displaying musophobia

An exaggerated, phobic fear of mice and rats has traditionally been depicted as a stereotypical trait of women, with numerous books, cartoons, television shows, and films portraying women screaming and jumping onto chairs or tables at the sight of a mouse. Despite this portrayal, murophobia has always been experienced by individuals of both sexes. However, women are twice as likely as men to have specific phobias, such as musophobia.

- In George Orwell's novel Nineteen Eighty-Four the protagonist Winston Smith has an intense fear of rats. Strapping a cage of hungry rats to his face is a technique used to get him to implicate his lover in thoughtcrimes.
- In the TV series Seinfeld, Frank Costanza has a profound fear of mice. In the episode "The Raincoats, Part 2", Frank threatens to move houses after George suggests there could be mice in their house. Kramer also appears to be afraid of mice in that same episode.
- In Indiana Jones and the Last Crusade, Henry Jones Sr. is described as being "scared to death" of rats.
- The titular character in the Doraemon series is scared of mice, due to having had his robotic ears bitten off by mice due to a mistaken order by Sewashi, as depicted in 1995 short film 2112: The Birth of Doraemon.
- The incarnation of Princess Zelda from The Legend of Zelda: Spirit Tracks will freeze in fear if she is met by rats.
- Madame Medusa, the main antagonist of Disney's The Rescuers (1977), an adaptation of Margery Sharp's children's novels, has extreme musophobia, becoming hysterical upon encountering the film's protagonists, a pair of friendly mice, while aiming to protect herself by jumping onto a chair and firing her shotgun. Ironically, her far more threatening pet crocodiles hardly make her uneasy.
- In Thomas & Friends, the opera singer Alicia Botti has an extreme fear of mice, screaming loudly enough to shatter windows and refusing to board Thomas's train upon seeing a mouse in one of Thomas's coaches.
- In Totally Spies! episode Malled Alex and Clover are afraid from rats and flies using jetpacks.
- Tin Top from Roary the Racing Car exhibited musophobia in the episode "Tin Top Gets Scared".
- Injun Joe is afraid of mice and rats in the 1995 anime movie, Huck and Tom's Mississippi Adventure.
- Countess Le Grande is afraid of mice in the 2002 sequel, Cinderella II: Dreams Come True. Especially Jaq, one of Cinderella's mouse friends.
- In the video game Donkey Kong Country 3: Dixie Kong's Double Trouble! the rideable/transformable elephant Ellie is afraid of rats and must throw a barrel at them. Additionally, there is a level called Stampede Sprint that centralizes on her fear of rats; at the beginning of the level you transform into Ellie only to be spooked by a few rats which causes Ellie to continuously barrage her way through the level.
- Bloodsport, as portrayed in the film The Suicide Squad, is afraid of rats, which is used many times for comedic effect.
- Lofty, a large blue anthropomorphic mobile crane from the Bob the Builder franchise, is known for being afraid of mice. This fear is great enough that he raced all the way back to the yard while in a faraway field. However, subsequent productions remove this fear entirely.
- In Tom and Jerry: Cowboy Up!, Bentley is afraid of mice including Jerry Mouse and Tuffy.
- Leo, a tabby cat from PAW Patrol, is shown to have fear of mice, but however, he overcomes his fear of mice.
- In the game Deltarune, Noelle Holiday initially has a fear of mouse-like enemies, but becomes more comfortable with them later on.

== See also ==
- List of phobias
