= Katie Griffin =

Canadian voice actress (born 1973)

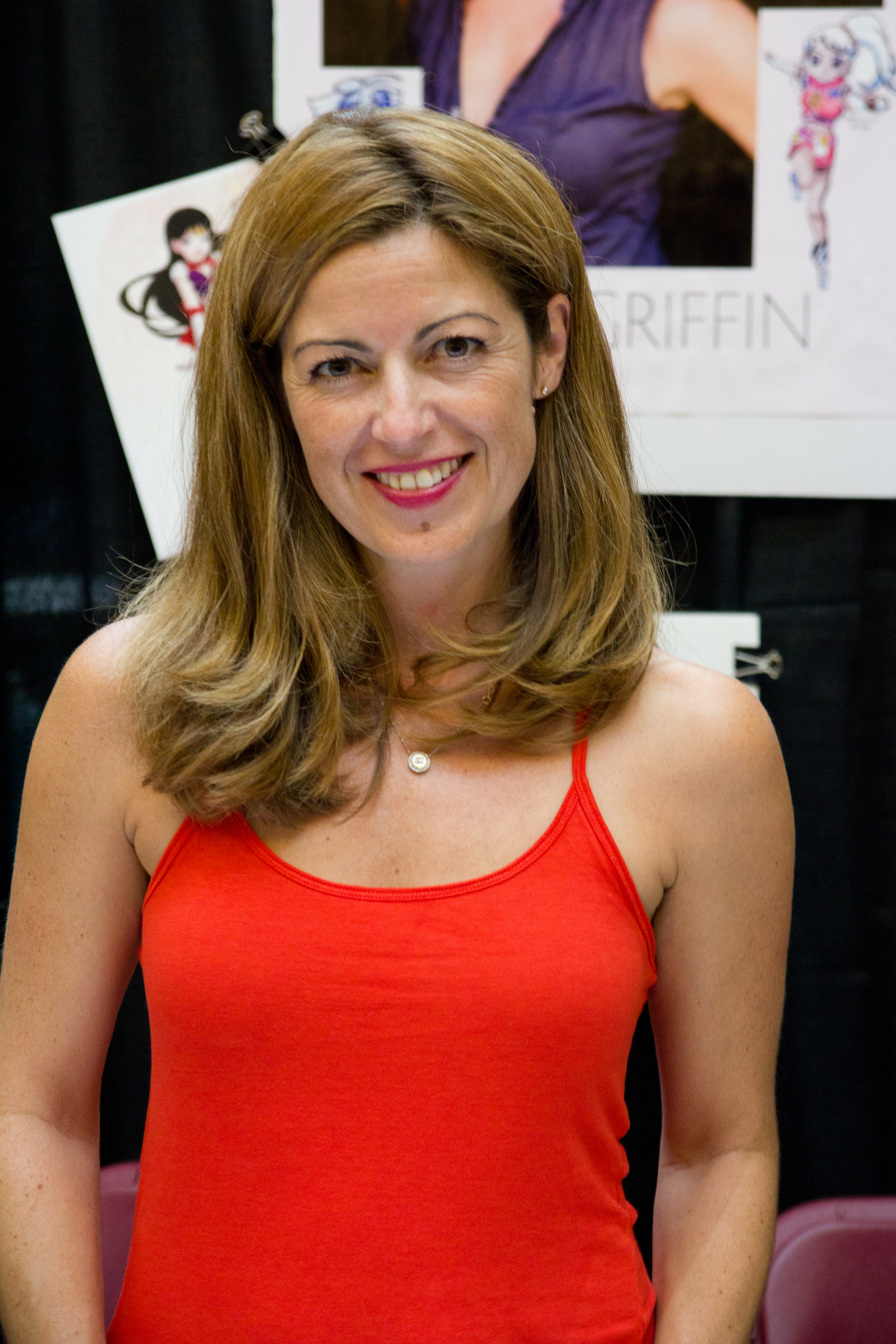
- Griffin at the 2012 Fan Expo Canada
- Born: January 14, 1973 (age 53); Scarborough, Ontario, Canada
- Education: Ryerson Polytechnical Institute (now Toronto Metropolitan University)
- Occupations: Actress; voice actress; singer
- Years active: 1988–present
- Spouse: Michael Kulas (m. 2004)
- Children: 2

Katie Griffin (born January 14, 1973) is a Canadian actress and singer who has appeared on television, films and voiced animations. Her roles include the voices of Sailor Mars in the original English Canadian dub of Sailor Moon, Lauren in Total Drama, Alex in Totally Spies!, Laugh-a-Lot Bear in Care Bears: Journey to Joke-a-lot, Farmer Shire in Corn & Peg and Ma Barker in Go, Dog. Go!.

== Early life ==
Griffin grew up in Scarborough, Ontario. Her mother was a teacher and her father was an air traffic controller. When she was eight, she attended Edgewood Junior Public School (Note: Edgewood became a K-8 school after the closure of Highbrook Senior Public School in 1985 by the Scarborough Board of Education.) and played the role of The Artful Dodger in her school play. Looking back at that period, Griffin said that she was more inspired by watching movies than theatre, especially concerning strong women, and cited her mom as a huge influence. Griffin also attended David and Mary Thomson Collegiate Institute graduating in 1991.

== Career ==
=== Acting ===
Griffin got her break into acting when she was 15 when she participated in a play at the Ryerson Theatre and was noticed by an agent. She was booked for local commercials and television spots in Canada as well as television movie specials. After graduating high school, she switched agents and continued with her acting gigs. When she was attending Ryerson Polytechnical Institute, she was offered a role in the television film "Up to Now" but it caused a conflict where she had to choose between acting or studying.

Griffin's first major role in an animated series was Sailor Mars in Sailor Moon, which at the time she had not realized was going to be popular. She was recommended to audition by Rino Romano, who voiced Tuxedo Mask. She described the role with Serena as best friends who sometimes fight, but not really the bully persona that was shown. She would record about two to three episodes a week, and it was not difficult on her voice. She likes that Mars is "fiercely loyal, strong, loves martial arts, sings... and the fact that she can summon fire and destroy evil, lol, Rei and I are very similar in character."

In the animated TV series Braceface, Griffin voices Nina, a mean eighth-grader girl who gives the title character her moniker. In the Moon Chase interview, Griffin said "I don't think I have one single thing in common with Nina, so it was fun playing that role. I guess in the end, I like playing badass kind of characters."

In voicing Alex in Totally Spies!, Griffin used a higher vocal register than usual. She was worried about nodules developing, and being recast when the series returned for season 6 following a hiatus, but was happy when she could return. She found the part to be really fun, easy to play, and liked that Alex was so lovely to animals. She notes that about the only thing Alex and Raye (Sailor Mars) have in common is their ability to kick some ass. She also voiced the character Ruby in Max & Ruby and Mary of the Geniuses and Miles of the Vegans in Total Drama Presents: The Ridonculous Race.

In live-action acting, she starred alongside Rob Lowe as his love interest in Too Late to Say Goodbye. She also worked with Nicole Kidman and Glenn Close.

=== Music ===
Some of Griffin's influences in her music style include: Sarah McLachlan, Madonna, The Tragically Hip, as well as alternative music bands Hole, Foo Fighters, No Doubt, and Radiohead. She enjoys singing but realized she wasn't going to get a record deal by just that. She learned guitar and began writing songs. Following one of the commercial voice-over jobs where she sang a jingle, she played some acoustic songs and her friend suggested she get her songs produced in an album. She was introduced to Michael Kulas of the band James. Kulas was able to produce many of her acoustic songs so that they became more of a pop/rock album. The album title Kiss Me Chaos was based on the Kiss Me, Kate musical, as she describes herself as being pretty strong and like "Kate the Shrew". It released in streaming service in February 2020.

== Personal life ==
Griffin is married to musician Michael Kulas. They have two children. Griffin enjoys martial arts films, playing guitar, and playing/watching hockey. She has a younger sister named Becky.

== Filmography ==
=== Live-action ===
==== Live-action feature films ====
- Boulevard (1994) – Lorraine
- To Die For (1995) – Girl at Bar
- Getting Away with Murder (1996) – Student (uncredited)
- The Real Blonde (1998) – Empty V Interviewer
- The Safety of Objects (2001) – Female Contestant #1, Sue
- Swindle (2002) – Judy
- Aurora Borealis (2005) – Sandy

==== Live-action direct-to-video and television films ====
- The World's Oldest Living Bridesmaid (1990) – Interviewee #2
- The Good Fight (1992) – Shelly
- Salem Witch Trails (1992) – Abigail Williams
- Getting Gotti (1994) – April
- Fatal Vows: The Alexandra O'Hara Story (1994) – Anna
- Prince of a Day (1995) – Gina
- Up to Now (1995)
- Electra (1996) – Mary Anne Parker
- Mr. Music (1998) – Profound Reporter
- Ricky Nelson: The Original Teen Idol (1999) – June Blair
- Black and Blue (1999) – Jennifer, Brunette Wife
- Daydream Believers: The Monkees Story (2000) – Award Presenter
- Lucky Day (2002) – Penny
- Power and Beauty (2002) – Judith Exner
- Protection (2001) – Gina
- America's Prince: The John F. Kennedy Jr. Story (2003) – Shrine Girl #1
- Candles on Bay Street (2006) – Naomi
- The Death of Alice Blue (2009) – Katie
- Too Late to Say Goodbye (2009) – Dara Prentice
- Desperately Seeking Santa (2011) – Sonia Moretti
- Z-Baw (2012) – Berdi

==== Live-action television series ====
- My Secret Identity (1990–1991) – Allison Nesbitt, Renee
- Are You Afraid of the Dark? (1992) – Dede (Tale of the Prom Queen)
- Katts and Dog (1993)
- Boogies Diner (1994) – Nikki
- Kung Fu: The Legend Continues (1994) – Girl #1
- Side Effects (1994) – Resident
- DNA (1994)
- Forever Knight (1995) – Jill
- The Great Defender (1995) – Receptionist
- Psi Factor: Chronicles of the Paranormal (1997–1998) – Amanda Sanderson, Mansfield's Sister
- The Adventures of Sinbad (1998) – Taryn
- Mythic Warriors: Guardians of the Legend (1998) – Siren #4
- Traders (1999)
- Total Recall 2070 (1999) – Attendant
- Earth: Final Conflict (1999) – Giselle
- The Associates (2001) – Bronwyn
- Doc (2003) – Diane Lang
- Wild Card (2004) – Cosmetics Customer
- Kevin Hill (2005) – Melissa Marsden
- Billable Hours (2006) – Receptionist
- The Best Years (2009) – Mom
- The Dating Guy (2009) – Girl #1, Zena, Charity
- Cra$h & Burn (2010) – Maya Porter
- The L.A. Complex (2012) – Stacey
- Annedroids (2013) – Nick's Mom – Pilot episode only
- Good Witch – Monica – Episode: "In Sickness and in Health"

=== Voice-over ===
==== Voice-over roles in feature film ====
- Totally Spies! The Movie (2010) – Alex & Caitlin
- The Nut Job (2014) – Pigeon

==== Voice-over roles in direct-to-video and television films ====
- Sailor Moon R the Movie: The Promise of the Rose (2000) – Raye Hino/Sailor Mars
- Sailor Moon S the Movie: Hearts in Ice (2000) – Raye Hino/Sailor Mars
- Sailor Moon SuperS The Movie: (2000) – Raye Hino/Sailor Mars
- Rescue Heroes: The Movie (2003) – Penny Pooler
- Care Bears: Journey to Joke-a-lot (2004) – Laugh-a-Lot Bear
- Care Bears: Big Wish Movie (2005) – Laugh-a-Lot Bear (uncredited)
- Beyblade: Fierce Battle (2004) – Ashley, Shadow Blader #2
- The Magic Hockey Stick (2012) – Mom – CBC Christmas Special

==== Voice-over dubbing recast roles in anime ====
- Sailor Moon (1995–2000) – Rei/Raye (Sailor Mars) (1995 and 2000)
- Beyblade (2002) – Mathilda, Additional Voices
- Interlude (2005) – Kaoruko Minegishi
- Bakugan Battle Brawlers (2008) – Julie Makimoto, Oberus, Daisy Makimoto, Makoto, Wavern
- Bakugan New Vestroia (2009) – Julie Makimoto
- Bakugan: Gundalian Invaders (2010) – Julie Makimoto
- Bakugan: Mechtanium Surge (2011) – Julie Makimoto, Sellon
- Beyblade: Metal Fusion (2011) – Hikaru Hazama
- Beyblade: Metal Masters (2011) – Hikaru Hazama, Mei-Mei

==== Voice-over roles in other television ====
- Braceface (2001–2004) – Nina Harper
- Undergrads (2001) – Charity
- Cyberchase (2002–present) – Calliope (episode: "Out of Sync"), Brigitt (episode: "Missing Bats in Sensible Flats")
- Max & Ruby (2002–2003; seasons 1–2) – Ruby
- Franny's Feet (2003–2010) – Additional Voices
- Totally Spies! (2004–2015) – Alex (seasons 3–6), Caitlin, Mindy, others
- 6teen (2005) – Lydia, Gwen
- Team Galaxy (2006) – Yoko, Princess Kimball
- Will & Dewitt (2007–2008) – Mom
- The Amazing Spiez! (2009) – Alex
- Dex Hamilton: Alien Entomologist (2008) – Jane
- Super Why! (2010) - The Tooth Fairy
- Stoked (2010) – Amber Green
- Skatoony (2010) – Posh Botts
- MetaJets (2011) – Maggie Strong/Foxtrot
- Redakai: Conquer the Kairu (2011–2012) – Zair
- Julius Jr. (2013–2015) – The Tooth Fairy
- Wishenpoof! (2014–2019) – Bianca's Mom
- Traffix – Oona
- Inspector Gadget (2015–2018) – Kayla
- Total Drama Presents: The Ridonculous Race (2015–2016) – Mary (1 episode), Miles (5 episodes)
- Rusty Rivets (2016–2020) – Ms. Rivets
- Mysticons (2017–2018) – Kitty Boon
- Cloudy with a Chance of Meatballs (2017–2018) – Sam Sparks
- The Great Northern Candy Drop (2017)
- Corn & Peg (2019–2020) – Farmer Shire
- Agent Binky: Pets of the Universe – (2019–2024) – Big Human
- Remy & Boo (2020) – Remy's Mom
- Glowbies (2021–2022) – Oily
- Go, Dog. Go! (2021–2023) – Maw Barker
- Open Season: Call of Nature (2023–2024) – Rosie
- Total Drama Island (2023–2024) – Lauren (Scary Girl), Water Glass Hallucination
- Superbuns (2023-2024) - Superbuns

== Discography ==
Albums

- Kiss Me Chaos (2003)

== Notes ==
Preceded by None	Voice of Sailor Mars; Eps. 7 - 65	Succeeded by Emilie-Claire Barlow
Preceded by Emilie-Claire Barlow	Voice of Sailor Mars; Eps. 83 - 159, Movies	Succeeded by Cristina Vee
