= Andrea Baker =

American actress

- Born: Andrea Taylor
- Education: Georgetown University
- Occupation: Actress
- Years active: 1993–present
- Agent(s): Arlene Thornton and Associates
- Known for: Pleasantville; Totally Spies!
- Spouse: James Baker (m. 2001)
- Children: 2
- Website: www.andreataylorbaker.com

Andrea Baker (née Taylor) is an American actress. In film, she is known for her role as Peggy Jane in the 1998 film Pleasantville, as well as her voice roles portraying Clover in the French-Canadian animated television series Totally Spies!.

== Career ==
After graduating from Georgetown University, Baker and a friend drove for more than six weeks across the US and eventually ended up in Los Angeles, California. She took a six-week "Acting for Commercials" course at Tepper Gallegos Casting, where she was introduced to her future agent, Steve Simon. Taylor also studied scene study in class mentored by Bobby Shaw Chance. She was signed on by Arlene Thornton's voice-over agency and then started voice acting for commercials and television in 1993.

Her first on-screen appearance was a small role on General Hospital in 1997. After graduating from DW Brown's studio, she auditioned for a role in the 1998 feature film Pleasantville. Barbara Harris introduced Baker to Nancy Meyers, who hired Baker as an "inner voice" actress on What Women Want. Baker has been working exclusively as a voice actress since 2001.

Besides from film and television, Baker has appeared in several plays for Afternoon Theatre, Basement Productions, and Joanne Baron Studios.

== Personal life ==
Baker met her husband James Baker, during production of What Women Want. They married in October 2001. They have two children together.

== Filmography ==
=== Film ===
Year	Title	Role	Notes	Source
1996	Morning Side Prep			
1998	Pleasantville	Peggy Jane		
2000	Panic	Candice		
2000	What Women Want	Office Intern		
2000	Dinosaur	Additional voices	Voice	
2001	Final Fantasy: The Spirits Within	Additional voices	Voice	
2004	Paparazzi	Emily		
2009	Jennifer's Body	Additional voices	Voice	
2010	Totally Spies! The Movie	Clover / Dominique	Voices	
2017	Cars 3	Additional voices	Voice	
2020	Love and Monsters	Additional Voices/ADR Group	Voice	

=== Television ===
Year	Title	Role	Notes	Source
1997	General Hospital			
1998	Beverly Hills, 90210	Julie Muntz	Recurring role (2 episodes) (as Andrea Taylor)	
1999	Charmed	Female victim	Episode: "When Bad Warlocks Go Good"	
1999	Buffy the Vampire Slayer	Sales girl	Episode: "The Prom"	
2001–2015	Totally Spies!	Clover, Dominique, others (voices)	Credited as Andrea Taylor for seasons 1 and 2	
2009	The Amazing Spiez!	Clover (voice)	Episode: "Operation: Dude Ranch Disaster"	

=== Video games ===
List of acting performances in video games
Year	Title	Role	Notes	Source
2005	Ultimate Spider-Man	Mary Jane Watson	First voice-over gig in video games.	
2007	Unreal Tournament 3	Sarah "Jester" Hawkins	Voice	
2010	Metal Gear Solid: Peace Walker	Soldiers / Extras	Voice	
2012	Resident Evil 6	Civilians		
2013	Resident Evil: Biohazard Anniversary Package	Civilians	Appears only in Resident Evil 6; archived	
