= A Kind of Magic (TV series) =

British animated television series

- Also known as: Magic
- Genre: Fantasy; Comedy
- Created by: Michel Coulon; Arthur de Pins
- Directed by: Charles Vaucelle (season 1); William Renaud (season 2)
- Voices of: Sauvane Delanoë; Kelly Marot; Colette "Coco" Noël; Claire Guyot; François Siener; Jérémy Prévost
- Theme music composer: Hervé Lavandier (season 1); Vincent Artaud (season 2)
- Opening theme: A Kind of Magic by Queen (cover)
- Composers: Hervé Lavandier (season 1); Vincent Artaud (season 2)
- Country of origin: France
- Original language: English
- No. of seasons: 2
- No. of episodes: 78

Production
- Executive producers: Marc du Pontavice; Katell Lardeux and Marie-Laurence Turpin (season 1); Dorothée Lanchier and Pierre Meloni (season 2)
- Producer: Marc du Pontavice
- Editors: Lou Bouniol; Saïd Ouadfel
- Running time: 26 minutes (season 1); 13 minutes (season 2)
- Production company: Xilam Animation

Original release
- Network: Disney Channel (season 1); Gulli (season 2)
- Release: 5 January 2008 – 22 February 2018

A Kind of Magic is a French animated television series created by Michel Coulon and Arthur de Pins. It was produced by Xilam Animation. The series was directed by Charles Vaucelle in season 1 and William Renaud in season 2, with David Gilson as character designer.

The series first aired in 2008 on Disney Channel in France. A second season started airing in 2018 on Canal J.

The entire series is available to watch on YouTube.

== Synopsis ==
The story deals with a 10-year-old child named Tom, and his family's problems, including his older sister Cindy (14 years old), who is crazy after every boy she sees, his toad 'His Highness', his evil maternal aunt Ferocia who wants to turn him evil as well, his ditzy fairy mother Willow and his vegetarian ogre father Gregore who have been exiled from Fairyland and now have to live on Earth.

== Characters ==
- Tom (voiced by Sauvane Delanoë) is the main protagonist and Cindy's 10-year-old younger brother. Clever, spontaneous, and mischievous, Tom has the presence of mind of a boy who has had to take care of himself from a very young age. Thanks to his limitless imagination and instinctive quick reflexes, he is able to convince anyone of anything. This skill is very useful to his absent-minded family members, who always forget that they no longer live in a world of magical creatures.
- Cindy (voiced by Kelly Marot) is Tom's 14-year-old older sister. Stubborn, rebellious, and very romantic, Cindy knows that a better future awaits her. In Fairyland, she was responsible for cleaning the sewers of the kingdom, but in the Real World, she dreams of grand projects and a more agreeable life. Like all teenagers, she worries about being accepted by the other children at school. In general, she opposes the use of magic because she considers it distasteful, but she makes use of it when it helps her accomplish what she wants.
- Ferocia (voiced by Isabelle Leprince) is Tom and Cindy's aunt, Willow's sister, a witch, and an anti-hero (also a main villain when she has power). Many words describe Ferocia that her personality has: horrible, cruel, wicked, and a pain in the rear, but also neutral. She delights in causing mayhem, even for her own family. She laughed when her brother planned to rob her sister and brother-in-law of all their savings, and she enjoyed frightening Tom with the idea of being forgotten if his parents had more children. She adores tormenting Gregor and will take every opportunity to do so. She also likes to taunt His Highness about his ugliness. Ferocia has a macabre sense of humor and sees horror films as comedies. When she had her powers, she was a villain to be feared.
- Jojo (voiced by Coco Noël), Tom's best friend.
- Willow (voiced by Claire Guyot) is Tom and Cindy's mother, Ferocia's sister, and Gregore's wife. Willow is optimistic, light-hearted, positive, motherly, and carefree. She also has a mischievous side as seen in "Meet the Parent" and "Framed!". She believes that good will always conquer evil. She can be strict when she has to, and she can be overprotective shown in the Wishing Powder. Willow is also a strong woman, always honest with her heritage and who she is. While she tried to integrate into the real world, she refused to forget who and what she was. She also stood up for herself, not letting anyone take her for granted and not letting the world disappoint her. Underneath her cheerful, positive, and carefree personality, Willow is a very smart woman. However, she is very dashing and innocent. Even as a fairy in the real world and wonderland, she flies and uses her wand to do magic.
- Gregor (voiced by François Seiner (season 1), Jérémy Prévost (season 2)) is Tom and Cindy's father and Willow's husband. Despite giving up on becoming a reformed ogre, he is a sweet, kind, gentle, and responsible father to Tom and Cindy. In addition, he is always a little clumsy, kind, and cheerful, but cowardly and afraid of anything (except dentists). Towards a difficult personality when he dislikes Cindy's antics and mischief along with Ferocié's laughter, calling his name and insulting him except for whatever happens to him, he's often angry, fierce, aggressive, hot-tempered and always evil.
- Victor (voiced by Derville (season 1), Emanuel Saez (season 2)) Tom's boss enemy who likes to play bad tricks on him and Jojo.
- Uncle G (voiced by Serge Failu) Tom & Cindy's oldest uncle by 200,000 years.
- Marine (voiced by Raphaëlle Zémour (season 1), Fanny Bloc (season 2)) Tom & Jojo's enemy, Little Miss Fossette's best student ever, and Victor's ally.
- Mlle Fossette (voiced by Sophie Santalï), Tom and Jojo's teacher at their school. There's also GooglyEyes, but she was a past mental figure and does not exist.

== Production ==
The series was rated the most popular series at the 2007 MIPCOM Junior trade show, attracting over 280 buyers. The musical theme is an adaptation of the song A Kind of Magic by the British band Queen. The series' main character designer, David Gilson, was hired when an artist left the cartoon and also because his art style was somewhat similar to that of Arthur de Pins, the series' creator. The first season cost €7 million.

On 3 November 2015, Xilam announced the production of a second season containing fifty-two thirteen-minute episodes for 2016.

== Episodes ==
Season 1 (Directed by Charles Vaucelle)
Number in series	Number of season	English name	French name	Written by	Storyboard by
1	1	Memory Gaps	Trous de mémoire!	Michel Coulon	Laurent Jennet
2	2	Meet the Parent	Bonjour la famille!	Bob Mittenthall Gloria Ketterer	Charles Vaucelle
3	3	Trust	La confiance règne	Steve Sustarsic (Stephen Sustarsic)	Vincent Dubost
4	4	Framed!	Le vol	Yves Coulon Jean-Marc Lenglen	Laurent Jennet
5	5	Big Love	Trompeuses apparences	Mark Hodkinson	Fred Mintoff Sandra Derval
6	6	Uncle Sandman	Le marchand de sable	Steve Sustarsic (Stephen Sustarsic)	Sandra Derval
7	7	The Ventriloquist	Le ventriloque	Richard Conroy	Frederic Mintoff
8	8	Wishing Powder	Lessivés!	Mark Hodkinson	Vincent Dubost
9	9	What Big Teeth You Have	Que vous avez de grandes dents	Linda O'Sullivan	Laurent Jennet
10	10	Ugly, Idle & Nasty	Affreux, Fainéants et Méchants!	Yves Coulon	Vincent Dubost
11	11	When an Ogre Loves a Fairy	L'ogre et la fée	Mark Hodkinson	Frederic Mintoff
12	12	A Dog's Life	Une vie de chien	Michel Coulon	Jean-Luc Abiven
13	13	A Fairytale Wedding	Pour le meilleur ou pour le pire?	Jean-Marc Lenglen	Laurent Jennet
14	14	The Truth, Nothing But the Truth	La vérité, rien que la vérité!	Michel Coulon	Frederic Mintoff
15	15	An Awkward Visit	Une visite gênante	Yves Coulon	Laurent Jennet
16	16	Family Matters	Affaires de famille	Alain Vallejo	Agop Besson
17	17	Peekaboo Tom!	Pas vu, pas pris	Yves Coulon Jean-Marc Lenglen	Vincent Dubost
18	18	The Wand's Burial	L'enterrement de la baguette	Yves Coulon Jean-Marc Lenglen	Laurent Jennet
19	19	Lovely Dragon	Un amour de dragon	Yves Coulon Jean-Marc Lenglen	Ludovic Hell
20	20	Babysitting	Baby-sitting	Linda O'Sullivan	Laurent Jennet
21	21	Whatever You Wish	À vos souhaits!	Michel Coulon	Vincent Dubost
22	22	Daddy Un-Cool	Papa pas cool	Marteinn Thorisson	Ferderic Mintoff
23	23	Deep Freeze	Debout là-dedans!	Yves Coulon Marc Lenglen	Laurent Jennet
24	24	Mosquito Fairy	Le moustique	Michel Coulon	Yves Corriger
25	25	Only Child	Fils unique	Yves Coulon Jean-Marc Lenglen	Séverine Morin
26	26	Home Sweet Home	Conte à rebours	Yves Coulon Jean-Marc Lenglen	Jean-Louis Champault

Season 2 (Directed by William Renaud)
Number in series	Number of season	English name	French name	Written by	Storyboard by
27	1	Candy Through the Looking Glass	De l'autre côté du miroir	Fiona Leibgorin	Matthieu Pitschon
28	2	Trapped as a Tomboy	Un garçon presque manqué	Lison d'Andrea	Etienne Pinault
29	3	The Future's Tense	Futur Imparfait	Fiona Leibgorin	Alexandre Ulmann
30	4	A Natural Beauty	Belle à l'intérieur	Jean-Marc Lenglen	Olivier Dutranoy
31	5	Going Viral	Les stars de l'école	Jean-Marc Lenglen	Jerome Fardini
32	6	Operation Tamara	Opération Tamara	Jean-Marc Lenglen	Paul Herve
33	7	My Dad the Super Hero	Mon père ce super-héros	Michel Coulon	Alexandre Ulmann
34	8	A Princess for His Highness	Une princesse pour mon Monseigneur	Alexandre Reverend Renaud Gagnon	Etienne Pinault
35	9	The Tables Have Turned	La triche	Yves Coulon	Jerome Fardini
36	10	The Clay Model	Pote à modeler	Renaud Gagnon	Etienne Pinault
37	11	Thicker Than Mud	Un air de famille	Caroline Torreli	Alexandre Ulmann
38	12	The Spellbook Strike Back	À chacun sa voix	Laure-Elizabeth Bourdaud Elisa Loche	Olivier Dutranoy
39	13	The Pixel and the Profile	Fée's Bok	Fiona Leibgorin	Etienne Pinault
40	14	Tom's Tall Tales	Tom pousse	Arnold Boiseau	Jerome Fardini
41	15	Willoween	Willoween	Renaud Gagnon	Stéphane Annette
42	16	Fairy Busy	Un travail de fée	Michel Coulon (Based on Story By Michel Coulon And Charles Vaucelle)	Alexandre Ulmann
43	17	Cinderella's Rebellion	Cendrillon se rebelle	Michel Coulon	Etienne Pinault
44	18	Your Own Medicine	Dans la peau d'un crapaud	Renaud Gagnon	Stephane Annette
45	19	The Ogre Who Wanted to Be Santa Claus	L'ogre qui voulait être le père Noël	Michel Coulon	Alexandre Ulmann
46	20	Grunda's Goodies	Les Délices de Gründa	Lison d'Andrea	Alexandre Ulmann
47	21	The Prince, the Frog and the Witch	Le Prince, la grenouille et la sorcière	Michel Coulon	Etienne Pinault
48	22	The Hybrid Heartthrob	L'Idéal de Cindy	Yves Coulon	Etienne Pinault
49	23	Professor Ferocia	Mademoiselle Férocette	Fiona Leibgorin	Stephane Annette
50	24	The Nature of the Beast	Grégor dans tous ses états	Lison d'Andrea	Jerome Fardini Alexandre Ulmann
51	25	Ferocia Fiancé	Les Fiançailles de Férocia	Caroline Torrelli	Alexandre Ulmann
52	26	Tom the Sore Thumb	Tom sans famille	Laure-Elizabeth Bourdaud Johanna Goldschmidt Elisa Loche	Alexandre Ulmann
53	27	Cat's Got Your Tongue	Une vie de chat	Michel Coulon	Stéphane Annette
54	28	Jojo the Dodo	C'est pas Jojo	Lison d'Andrea	Alexandre Ulmann
55	29	The Big Bad Field Trip	Promenons-nous dans les bois	Elisa Loche	Stéphane Annette
56	30	Mrs. Nice Ferocia	Férocia super sympa	Fiona Leibgorin	Alexandre Ulmann
57	31	Strong as an Ogre	Petit ogre deviendra grand	Cyril Deydier Renaud Gagnon	Etienne Pinault
58	32	In Your Wildest Dream	Même pas en rêve	Michel Coulon	Alexandre Ulmann
59	33	Master of Delusion	Abracadabra	Michel Coulon	Alexandre Ulmann
60	34	Big Bad Dog	Le Grand gentil loup	Elisa Loche Pierre Le Gall	Etienne Pinault
61	35	A Fish Out of Water	Comme un poisson dans l'eau	Renaud Gagnon	Stéphane Annette
62	36	The Fairyksen Family	Ma famille pas féerique	Fiona Leibgorin	Alexandre Ulmann
63	37	A Valentine's Pipe Dream	Ma sorcière mal-aimée	Lison d'Andrea	Alexandre Ulmann
64	38	No Kidding Around	Un jeu d'enfants	Lison d'Andrea	Alexandre Ulmann
65	39	No Strings Attached	Inséparables	Lison d'Andrea	Stéphane Annette
66	40	The Cruelest of Them All	Blanche-Niaise et les sept nains	Renaud Gagnon	Etienne Pinault
67	41	Beauty and the Mangy Beast	La belle et la grosse bête	Michel Coulon	Stéphane Annette
68	42	Prince Not-So-Charming	Monseigneur dans toute sa splendeur	Fiona Leibgorin	Alexandre Ulmann
69	43	Love Gives You Wings	L'amour donne des ailes	Elisa Loche Pierre Le Gall	Etienne Pinault
70	44	The Charming Ogre	L'Ogre charmant	Caroline Torrelli Pierre Le Gall	Alexandre Ulmann
71	45	Can't Scare Me	Même pas peur	Renaud Gagnon	Stephane Annette
72	46	Mirror, Mirror, Off the Wall	Miroir, mon beau miroir	Michel Coulon	Alexandre Ulmann
73	47	An Almost-Perfect Day	Une journée presque parfaite	Renaud Gagnon	Alexandre Ulmann
74	48	Right Under Your Nose	Au nez et à la barbe	Lison d'Andrea	Alexandre Ulmann
75	49	Mom, We Broke the Wand!	Maman, on a cassé la baguette!	Lison d'Andrea	Alexandre Ulmann
76	50	My Worst Best Friend	Ma nouvelle meilleure amie	Elisa Loche Pierre Le Gall	Stephane Annette
77	51	Princess Melba Three	Princesse Melba III	Renaud Gagnon	Romain Cislo
78	52	In My Shoes	Vis ma vie	Pierre Le Gall	Alexandre Ulmann
