= OUAT Entertainment =

French video game studio

Ouat Entertainment
- Industry: Video games
- Founded: March 25, 1999; 26 years ago in Angoulême, state, France
- Defunct: May 30, 2019
- Headquarters: Angoulême, France
- Key people: Frédérique Doumic, Sébastien Doumic, Fabrice Passaquay
- Number of employees: 13
- Website: ouat-e.com

OUAT Entertainment was a French studio that creates and publishes Video games. OUAT is the acronym of Once Upon A Time, the logo of the company represent the symbols of the circle (O), the square [U], the triangle (A) and the cross (T).

== History ==
Since 1999, OUAT Entertainment produces casual videogames on several platforms (Facebook, PC, OS X, iPhone, iPad, DS, PS2, Wii) in partnership with publishers (Ubisoft, Atari, Universal, Hasbro). Since 2009, OUAT creates and publishes its own casual and social games.

The company has specialized itself in the production of video games based on intellectual properties (Totally Spies, Kirikou, Les Incollables, Plus Belle La Vie). OUAT also creates its own IP (Intellectual Properties) such as Miss Teri Tale, Pure Hidden, Eden's Quest : The Hunt for Akua, or Kompany! and lastly Voyage to Fantasy.

Since 2016, Ouat Entertainment specialises itself in the production of mobile applications and mobile video games including Identity Pursuit and Word Heroes.

== Developed games ==
Title	Year	Platforms
Kirikou	2001	Game Boy Color
Azur & Asmar	2007	PC
Totally Spies! 3 : Agents secrets	2007	Nintendo DS
Totally Spies!: Totally Party	2007	PC, PlayStation 2, Wii
Miss Teri Tale: Where is Jason?	2008	PC, Mac OS
Miss Teri Tale 2: Vote 4 Me!	2008	PC, Mac OS
Martin Mystère : L'Attaque des Monstres	2008	Nintendo DS
Totally Spies ! 4 : Autour du monde	2008	Nintendo DS
Kirikou et les bêtes sauvages	2008	Nintendo DS
Totally Spies ! Mon agenda secret	2009	Nintendo DS
Pure Hidden	2009	PC, Mac OS, IPhone
Danger next door - Une aventure de Miss Teri Tale	2009	PC, Mac OS
Eden's Quest : The Hune for Akua	2010	PC, Mac OS, IPhone, IPad
Totally Spies! Fashion Agents	2010	Facebook
Kompany	2012	Facebook
Plus Belle La Vie	2012	Facebook
Lucky Pirate	2013	Facebook, iOS
Murder in Provence	2013	Facebook
Voyage to Fantasy	2013	Facebook, iOS, Android
Jigsaw Puzzle Fantasy	2015	Facebook
Smart Cookie Cat	2015	Facebook, Android, iOS
Corpus Gang	2015	Android, iOS
Puzzle Museum	2015	Facebook
Identity Pursuit	2016	Android, iOS
Word Heroes	2017	Android, iOS
