= Totally Spies! =

French-Canadian teen television series

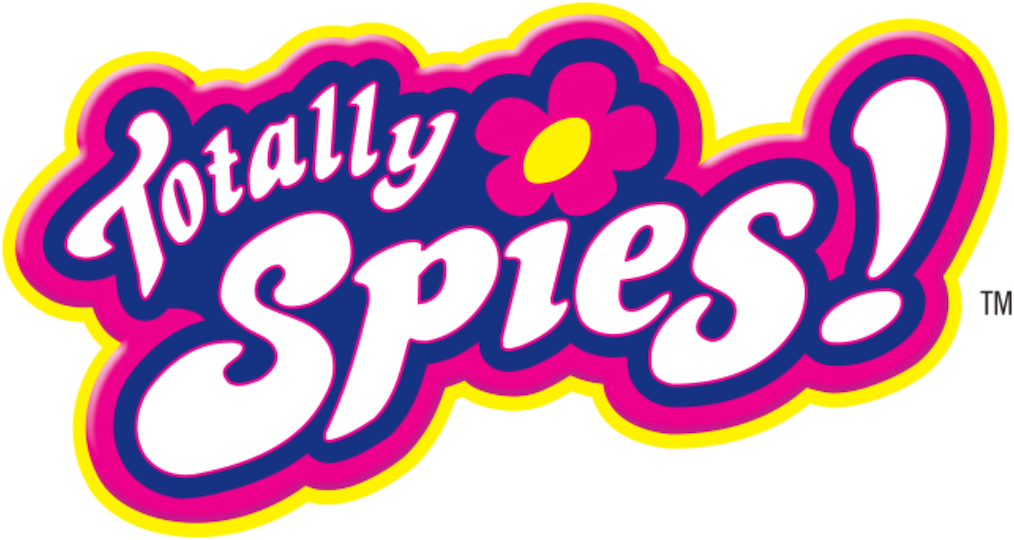
- Genre: Spy fiction; Comedy
- Created by: Vincent Chalvon-Demersay; David Michel
- Directed by: Stephane Berry; Pascal Jardin; Franck Michel
- Voices of: List: French; Claire Guyot; Fily Keita; Céline Mauge; Jean-Claude Donda; Laura Préjean; Déborah Claude; Gauthier Battoue; English; Jennifer Hale; Andrea Baker; Katie Leigh; Katie Griffin; Jess Harnell; Adrian Truss; Ali Ryan; Kira Riley; Lori Felipe-Barkin; Gary Mack; Sarah Naughton; Alana Barrett-Atkins; Arjun Biju; Jody Doo
- Theme music composer: Miranda Cooper; Brian Higgins; Thierry Samoy; Yorgos Benardos; Dorothée Hannequin; Aslak Lefèvre; Mathieu Rosenzweig; Mila Branger
- Opening theme: "Here We Go" (seasons 1–2); "You've Got a Secret" (German, season 1); "Here We Go (Remix)" (seasons 3–5); "Supergirl" (French, season 5); "We Are Totally Spies!" (season 6); "Top Secret Mission" (season 7)
- Ending theme: "Here We Go" (instrumental) (seasons 1–2) "Here We Go (Remix)" (instrumental) (seasons 3-5) "We Are Totally Spies!" (instrumental) (season 6); Top Secret Mission" (instrumental) (season 7)
- Composers: Brian Higgins; Nick Coler; Tim Powell; Fabrice Aboulker; Pascal Stive; Eric Uzan; Olivier Villaudy; Yannis Dumoutier; Adam Baker
- Countries of origin: France; Canada (seasons 3–5)
- Original languages: French; English
- No. of seasons: 8
- No. of episodes: 208 (list of episodes)

Production
- Executive producers: Vincent Chalvon-Demersay; Sylvain Viau; Michelle Lamoreaux; Robert Lamoreaux; Gary Milne; Ludovic Taron
- Producers: Vincent Chalvon-Demersay; David Michel; Benoît Di Sabatino
- Running time: 22 minutes
- Production companies: Zodiak Kids & Family France (Note: Credited as Marathon Animation for the first five seasons, and as Marathon Media / Images for the sixth season.); Image Entertainment Corporation (seasons 3–5); Ollenom Studio (season 7)

Original release
- Network: TF1 (France); Teletoon (Canadian English); Télétoon (Canadian French)
- Release: 3 November 2001 – 3 October 2013
- Network: Gulli (France)
- Release: 3 November 2001 – 3 October 2013
- Release: 12 May 2024 – present

Related
- The Amazing Spiez!

Totally Spies! is a French animated spy fiction television series created by Vincent Chalvon-Demersay and David Michel mainly produced by French company Zodiak Kids & Family France, with seasons three to five being co-produced with Canadian company Image Entertainment Corporation. (Note: Produced with the participation of le Centre National de la Cinematographie, Procirep (seasons 2-5), TF1 (season 6), The Walt Disney Company France (season 6), Gulli (season 7), M6 (season 7), Warner Bros. Discovery EMEA (season 7), and Warner Bros. Discovery Latin America (season 7), in association with Channel 4 (seasons 1-2), Merchandising München GmbH (seasons 1-2), the Canadian Film or Video Production Tax Credit (seasons 3-5), the Québec Film and Television Tax Credit (seasons 3-5), Telefilm Canada (seasons 3-5), in collaboration with Teletoon (seasons 3-5).) It focuses on three teenage girls from Beverly Hills, California, who work as undercover agents for the World Organization of Human Protection (WOOHP).

Prior to its debut in France on April 3, 2002, on TF1's TFOU block, (Note: The block was named TF! Jeunesse until 2006.) the series was first shown in the United States on November 3, 2001, on ABC Family before moving to Cartoon Network, and later to Universal Kids for the sixth season. It premiered in Canada on Teletoon on September 2, 2002, for the English version, and on Télétoon for the French version. During its original run, the show spanned five seasons, with 130 episodes and several specials. A sixth season was released in 2013 on the same block TFOU. In 2017, Totally Spies began airing on Gulli. Following a ten-year hiatus, a seventh season premiered in France via Gulli on May 12, 2024, and internationally through both Cartoon Network and Discovery Kids on January 4, 2025; the series is renewed for an eighth season.

Totally Spies! developed a cult following worldwide. The series also spawned a media franchise with several products tied to it, including various comic books, novels and video games. A film adaptation based on the series and serving as its prequel, Totally Spies! The Movie, was released theatrically in 2009 in France. A spin-off series titled The Amazing Spiez! premiered in 2009 and ran for two seasons.

== Premise ==
The series focuses on the adventures of three teenage girls from Beverly Hills, California – Clover, Sam, and Alex – who live a double life as secret agents working for the World Organization of Human Protection (WOOHP). The girls are recruited by the organization's leader, Jerry, to solve worsening crime conditions that arise across the globe. The spies sport colourful latex jumpsuits and are provided with various gadgets to aid in their investigations. Their primary missions involve dealing with disgruntled and vengeful criminals who have been inconvenienced in some form in the past. Other missions have the same villains plotting revenge on the spies by ruining their personal lives. Framing each episode is a subplot that focuses on the girls' everyday lives as high school (and later university) students, dealing with relationships and their longtime high school nemesis Mandy.

== Main characters ==
- Clover (voiced by Fily Keita in the French dub, Andrea Taylor (seasons 1–6) and Ali Ryan (season 7–present) in the English dub) is the fashionable one of the trio. While she is athletic, agile, and strong, she is also impulsive and spontaneous, never thinking twice before jumping into action. She is always ready to teach villains a lesson, even if she has no chance of winning against them. Her spy suit is red.
- Sam (voiced by Claire Guyot in the French dub, Jennifer Hale (seasons 1–6) and Kira Riley (season 7–present) in the English dub), is the intellectual of the trio. She acts as an elder sister to her friends, being rational, logical, and the most mature of the group. More sensible than Alex and less superficial than Clover, her intelligence and composure allow her to find effective solutions to complicated problems. Her spy suit is green.
- Alex (voiced by Céline Mauge in the French dub, Katie Leigh (seasons 1 and 2); Katie Griffin (seasons 3–6) and Lori Felipe-Barkin (season 7–present) in the English dub) is the heart of the trio. She values her friendship with Sam and Clover above all else and will do anything to keep the trio united and happy. Although she admires Sam and Clover, she effaces somewhat in their presence. She is very affectionate and unafraid to show her feelings. Her spy suit is yellow.
- Jerry Lewis (voiced by Jean-Claude Donda in the French dub, Jess Harnell (seasons 1 and 2); Adrian Truss (seasons 3–6) and Gary Mack (season 7–present) in the English dub) is the founder of WOOHP. From seasons one to six, he is the president of the agency and the trio's superior. He assigns the trio with missions and takes a certain pleasure in summoning them at inopportune moments. Despite his age, he is sufficiently athletic when helping the trio on certain missions. He remains attached to his cultural roots and often plays with his British phlegm with the trio, who do not hesitate to tease him about his cheesy gentlemanly demeanor.
- Mandy (voiced by Céline Mauge in the French dub, Jennifer Hale (seasons 1–6) and Sarah Naughton (season 7–present) in the English dub) is a classmate and rival to the girls in their lives outside of WOOHP. Rich, popular and charismatic, she is in perpetual conflict with the trio, locking horns with them over boys, contests or clothing they covet.
- G.L.A.D.I.S. (seasons 3 and 4; voiced by Laura Préjean in the French dub and Stevie Vallance in the English dub) is an artificial intelligence that assists Jerry in distributing gadgets during the third and fourth seasons. G.L.A.D.I.S. was dropped from the series before the fifth season, having been sent by Jerry to WOOHP's recycling facility.
- Zerlina Lewis (season 7; voiced by Déborah Claude in the French dub, and by Alana Barrett-Adkins in the English dub) is Jerry's daughter and the new president of WOOHP following her father's retirement.
- Toby (season 7; voiced by Gauthier Battoue in the French dub and Arjun Biju in the English dub) is a young high-tech genius who assists Zerlina in the creation and distribution of the girls' gadgets.
- Mei Lin (French version) / Glitterstar (English version) (season 7; voiced by Geneviève Doang in the French dub and Jody Doo in the English dub) is the manager of Bubble Spy Cafe, run by WOOHP, the World Organization Of Human Protection. Despite this, she does not know of the girls' secret spy life. Her spy suit is orange.

== Episodes ==
Season	Episodes	Air date		Channel
Season	Episodes	First aired	Last aired	Channel
1	26	(United States) November 3, 2001 (France) April 3, 2002 (Canada) September 2, 2002	(United States) June 15, 2002 (Canada) December 6, 2002	(United States) ABC Family (France) TF1 (Canada) Teletoon
2	26	(Canada) April 7, 2003 (United States) August 8, 2003	(Canada) July 6, 2003 (United States) September 19, 2004	(Canada) Teletoon (United States) Cartoon Network (France) TF1
3	26	(Canada) September 12, 2004 (United States) October 3, 2004	(Canada) May 25, 2005 (United States) July 31, 2005	(Canada) Teletoon (United States) Cartoon Network (France) TF1
4	26	(Canada) March 13, 2006 (United States) April 3, 2006	(Canada) February 5, 2007 (United States) March 8, 2007	(Canada) Teletoon (United States) Cartoon Network (France) TF1
5	26	(Canada) August 31, 2007 (United States) April 26, 2010	(Canada) March 19, 2008 (United States) June 1, 2010	(Canada) Teletoon (United States) Cartoon Network (France) TF1
Film		(France) July 22, 2009 (United States) April 25, 2010		(France) Mars Films (United States) Cartoon Network
6	26	(France) June 19, 2013 (Canada) September 7, 2014 (United States) April 10, 2020	(France) October 3, 2013 (Note: The season 6 end date of October 3, 2013, does not include the final two episodes which previously aired as part of a special event in June 2013.) (Canada) March 1, 2015 (United States) April 19, 2020	(France) TF1 (Canada) Teletoon (United States) Universal Kids
7	26	(France) May 12, 2024 (United States) January 4, 2025	(France) November 15, 2025 (United States) September 26, 2026	(France) Gulli (United States) Cartoon Network
8	26	(France) August 26, 2026 (United States) TBA	(France) TBA (United States) TBA	(France) Gulli (United States) Cartoon Network

== Conception, development and production ==
=== Seasons 1–5 ===
Opening titles for seasons 1 & 2.

The series' conception came from the rise of girl groups and female singers in the music industry. Wanting to capitalize on the niche, David Michel and Vincent Chalvon-Demersay put their idea into development, which later shifted into production within a year. According to Michel, the series' animation style was influenced by anime. The production company, Marathon Media, intended on building on the series brand by forming a three-piece girl band, utilizing German talk show Arabella to create it. Using a panel of judges, 20 demo videos were selected and the winners were selected based on the strength of their performance and the series' viewers. The band was selected and released a single in the spring of 2002, through EMI. According to managing director Dirk Fabarius, "The plan is to eventually create an entire album and establish and promote Totally Spies as a real band." While the idea did not materialize, the series was promoted through other merchandising. It was announced in Spring 2001 that the series would air in the fall on ABC Family in the United States, and would be distributed to the European countries in the following year. Fox Kids Europe acquired European merchandising rights to the series in July 2001, excluding German-speaking territories.

In an interview with WorldScreen.com, Michel explained that prior to the series, there were a lot of boy action-adventure shows and practically nothing for girls, yet in pop culture, there were Britney Spears and the Spice Girls. He explained that the characters are heavily inspired by the movie Clueless and wanted to mix that with a James Bond format. When they first pitched the show, it had a moderate response, but when the first season was broadcast, the Charlie's Angels film came out, and suddenly the market was full of girl show properties.

According to an article, "Achieving a Global Reach on Children's Cultural Markets" by Valerie-Ines de la Ville and Laurent Durup, the series was originally designed to reach an American audience, but has garnered appeal from its humor "based on a stereotypical European vision of American references" while "appearing to be original and innovative to the U.S. audience". Producer and artistic director Stephane Berry explained that the style "is a melting between the American style, which associates action and comedy, and Japanese design for the aesthetic environment and the emotions expressed through the large eyes of the characters". Some of the common references have included Charlie's Angels, Beverly Hills, The Avengers, James Bond and its gadgets, and Cat's Eye.

The character design was originally done by Gil Formosa. (Note: "A Thing for Musicians". Totally Spies!. Season 1. Episode 1.)

The head writers for the series were Robert and Michelle Lamoreaux, who were based in Los Angeles and had worked on Nickelodeon shows. Demersay and Stephane Berry had both recently worked with Saban Entertainment in Europe. In a GeoCities interview, Kate Griffin, who voices Alex, mentioned that the typical session for the three girls is that they would record as an ensemble, but through a phone patch, with Hale and Baker calling from Los Angeles, and herself in Toronto.

Following the end of the fifth season, the series' movie, Totally Spies! The Movie, was produced and released to theatres in France on 22 July 2009. The movie received a telecast release in the United States on 25 April the following year, coinciding with the airing of the series' fifth season there.

=== Seasons 6–present ===
In August 2011, Marathon Media confirmed that production for a sixth season was underway and set to premiere in 2013, with Jennifer Hale, Andrea Baker, Katie Griffin and Adrian Truss reprising their roles. The sixth series would be produced only by Marathon in association with TF1 and The Walt Disney Company France. It was later confirmed that 26 episodes would be produced and that the series would be licensed in Spain and Latin America, with European territories following suit. To coincide with the sixth season's premiere, Zodiak Kids CP Paris, in association with Château de Versailles Spectacles (CVS) and TF1, organized an event at the Palace of Versailles, taking place during Summer 2013. The event would be preceded by activities, including a screening of a special featuring the spies on a mission in the palace gardens.

On 8 January 2022, Thomas Astruc, the creator of Miraculous Ladybug, who had previously worked on Totally Spies!, announced on Twitter that a new season of the latter was "in the making". On the 13th, revised character designs for Sam, Alex and Clover were revealed. It was originally set to premiere in 2023, but was later pushed back to 2024. The upcoming series will be produced by Zodiak Kids & Family Studio France, with Ollenom (Production subsidiary of fellow Zodiak Kids & Family subsidiary Monello Productions) as co-producer, and French-broadcaster Gulli and Latin American-broadcaster Discovery Kids as participators. On 25 April 2023, it was announced that Warner Bros. Discovery had acquired broadcast rights to the series in the United States and EMEA regions, where the series would air on Cartoon Network in the United States and stream on Max in EMEA regions. In September 2023, Andrea Baker (the voice actress of Clover) confirmed on her Twitter that she and the rest of the voice cast would not be returning.

On 13 June 2024, it was announced that the show had been renewed for an eighth season.

== Telecast and home media ==
In the U.S., Totally Spies! premiered on 3 November 2001 on Fox Family/ABC Family (now Freeform). It later premiered in Europe on pay-TV and terrestrial channels such as Germany's ProSieben, France's TF1, United Kingdom's Channel 4 and the localised Fox Kids channels throughout the region during the spring of 2002. The show was moved to Cartoon Network in July 2003 in the United States, where it attracted 1.6 million viewers (aged 4–10) daily and continued airing until 10 September 2010. In 2019, the show aired weeknights on the Universal Kids channel, which broadcast the show's sixth season for the first time in the United States.

Totally Spies! has attracted over one million viewers in France since its debut. It was re-licensed and its sixth season, along with Totally Spies! The Movie and the spin-off The Amazing Spiez!. The show aired its sixth season in France and is being aired around Europe. In Canada, Season 6 began airing on 7 September 2014 on Teletoon, and on 6 September on Télétoon. The show has been aired worldwide on various networks, such as TF1 in France; Teletoon in Canada, Fox Family/ABC Family, Cartoon Network, Universal Kids in the US; Fox Kids, Jetix, Cartoon Network, and Boomerang in Latin America and Brazil on pay-TV; Rede Globo in Brazil on terrestrial TV; ABS-CBN in the Philippines on terrestrial TV; ART Teenz, MBC 3 in the Middle East; Dragon Club in China; TVB in Hong Kong; Fox Kids, Jetix, Disney Channel, and Nickelodeon channels in Europe, Africa, Asia and Oceania. In Australia, it was shown on Network Ten and later on 10 Peach (formerly Eleven) as part of their Toasted TV block. Seasons 3–4 was aired on POP in the United Kingdom from 2013 to 2014. Season 5 started airing in 2015 and Season 6 the following year in 2016 until 2019. It was also briefly aired on its sister network, Pop Girl. It was aired on BBC Alba in Scotland. Season 1 aired on Disney Channel and Disney XD. It aired in Ireland on RTÉ Two from 11 September 2002 until 2009.

Since 2012, the show has had an official YouTube channel that has uploaded the majority of the episodes and even the film, and normally uploads random clips every Saturday. As of April 2021, the first six seasons of Totally Spies! are also available on Amazon Prime Video, which currently has the exclusive streaming rights in the U.S.

In 2004, Goodtimes Entertainment released the first twelve episodes of the show's first season on VHS and DVD on three volumes: Totally Spies Volume 1: First Secret Missions, Totally Spies Volume 2: The Getaway, and Totally Spies Volume 3: Spies Attack. Coinciding with the production and release of the show's sixth season, New Video Group/Flatiron Film Company acquired US DVD rights for the series as well as some digital rights for the first three seasons of the series. They released the first and second seasons (in two volumes each), as well as a box set containing seasons one through three. The third season was finally released in two volumes on 14 January 2014. As of 2020, these DVD sets are now out of print and very hard to find. Totally Spies! DVDs are also released in the United Kingdom by Sanctuary Visual Entertainment in 2005 and 2006, Totally Spies – First Secret Missions and Totally Spies – Spy Gladiators. This was released on DVD & Blu-ray in the U.S. by Universal Pictures Home Entertainment.

Season #	Release date (Region 1)	Volumes
1	13 August 2013	2 (2 discs each)
2	8 October 2013	2 (2 discs each)
3	14 January 2014	2 (2 discs each)
1–3	8 October 2013	Box set (12 discs)

== Reception ==
The series received mixed reviews from critics. Joly Herman of Common Sense Media gave the series a mixed review, rating the show 3 out of 5 stars and writing that "We think it's a decent show to catch once in a while, but anything more regular might give viewers the like, slightest headache." Joe Corey of Inside Pulse had a more positive review, calling the show "fun enough for small kids who want a Charlie's Angels undercover action show. The trio does their best to balance the fun of being in the espionage game without it being too risky." Matt Hinrichs of DVD Talk gave a positive review, calling the action in the first three seasons "decently written enough for adults to enjoy."

After four seasons, the show had reached over 130 countries and was met with enthusiasm among ages 6–11 that included both girls and boys, and had a Pokémon-like appeal to a broad range of age and gender. In an interview before season three, David Michel said, "The one thing that surprised us the most is the consistency in the male / female viewership split: from Brazil to Italy, we have a 50% boys 50% girls audience ratio, whereas everybody was predicting the show would score very low on boys." Scott Stoute of ScreenRant listed the show among his "10 Girl Cartoons (That Guys Secretly Love)" list.

The Parents Television Council, in their March 2006 report, noted that the show did not contain offensive language, but expressed concern about the "nature of the violence of the show" in an episode where rats were released to psychologically torture Jerry and Clover, and the sexual content exampled by a sunblock ad by a bikini-clad woman.

In 2022, a writer for the Architectural Digest magazine praised Totally Spies! for its interior design choices and its "hyper Y2K, retro futuristic style".

== Other media ==
=== Video games ===
Year	Title	Developer(s)	Publisher(s)	Platform(s)	Ref.
2004	Totally Spies! (Note: Promotional game, included in the Happy Meal in selected European McDonald's.)	TBA	McDonald's	Windows	
2005	Totally Spies! The Mobile Game	Gameloft	Gameloft	Mobile phones	
2005	Totally Spies!	Mistic Software	Atari Europe	Game Boy Advance	
2006	Totally Spies! Swamp Monster Blues	FiniteMonkey, Inc.	Mindscape (Note: Published by Brighter Minds Media outside of France.)	Windows	
2006	Totally Spies! Zombie Jamboree!	FiniteMonkey, Inc.	Mindscape	Windows	
2006	Totally Spies! 2: Undercover	Mistic Software	Atari Europe	Game Boy Advance / Nintendo DS	
2007	Totally Spies! Totally Party	OUAT Entertainment / Mad Monkey Studio	Ubisoft	Windows / PlayStation 2 / Wii	
2007	Totally Spies! 3: Secret Agent	OUAT Entertainment	Ubisoft	Nintendo DS	
2008	Totally Spies! 4: Around the World	OUAT Entertainment	Ubisoft	Nintendo DS	
2009	Totally Spies! Mon Agenda Secret (Note: Only published in France. However, multiple languages are available in-game.)	OUAT Entertainment	Ubisoft	Nintendo DS	
2024	Totally Spies! - Cyber Mission	Balio Studio	Microids	Nintendo Switch / PlayStation 4 / PlayStation 5 / Xbox One / Xbox Series / Windows	

=== Spin-off and crossover ===
A spin-off series called The Amazing Spiez! features new characters as spies, retaining Jerry as a regular character in the show. While the series focuses on four young teenage siblings—Lee, Megan, Marc, and Tony Clark, the three spy girls make an appearance on the crossover episode "Operation: Dude Ranch Disaster" from season 1. The show had its world premiere on 15 March 2009, on Disney Channel Asia; and its US premiere on 26 April 2010, on Cartoon Network. In Canada, the show premiered on 2 September 2010 on Teletoon. Only the first season and ten Season 2 episodes aired in the US. The Amazing Spiez! is set between the events of Totally Spies! seasons 6 and 7.

Totally Spies! also had a crossover episode in season 5 titled "Totally Mystery Much?" with Martin Mystery, a Marathon-produced series that aired from 2003 to 2006.

=== Live-action TV series ===
A live-action television series produced by Gloria Sanchez Productions, Banijay Kids & Family and Amazon MGM Studios is in development at Amazon Prime Video.

=== Comics and books ===
Totally Spies! comics were released monthly in Sweden. Five books with about 90 pages came out in Brazil as well. Each book represents an episode from the series. There is another comic called Totally Spies Unleashed; this opens with "I Hate the 80s!", in which a bad guy, Boogie Gus, has invented a retro ray that de-ages people. The second story, "Attack of the 50 Ft. Mandy", turns their nemesis into a giant in a plot that involves a beauty contest and an escaped evil scientist. Chapter books have also been released.
