= List of Totally Spies! characters =

The Spies. Left to right: Alex, Clover and Sam. As depicted prior to Season 7.

The animated television series Totally Spies! follows the adventures of three Beverly Hills teenage girls – Clover, Sam, and Alex – who work as secret agents on missions to save the world while keeping their identity a secret from their peers. Supporting the girls is their employer Jerry from the World Organization of Human Protection (WOOHP). The show has spawned a variety of characters including students from their high school and university, fellow WOOHP agents, and a cast of villains, many of whom have returned in later episodes.

== Main ==
=== Clover ===
Clover Ewing (voiced by Fily Keita in the French dub, Andrea Taylor/Baker (seasons 1–6) and Ali Ryan (season 7–present) in the English dub) has medium length blonde hair, light blue eyes, and medium-toned skin; she dons a red catsuit on missions. Of the three girls, she is the most expressive with the Beverly Hills teenage fashionista attitude, with a strong valspeak dialect, being the first to court the newest available good-looking boy, concerning herself with the latest clothes, diets, and trends, and often competing against Mandy in all sorts of popularity contests. Her Télétoon profile describes her as athletic, agile, strong, and especially impulsive, reacting spontaneously and jumping into action; and ready to teach the bad guys a lesson even if she has no chance of winning. A running gag of the series is she is frequently kidnapped. Overall she is the most victimized character of the three spies, often either kidnapped, brainwashed, or transformed in some way. She is often also the subject of the villains' revenge plots. She is also typically the engine of all the B plotlines of episodes, featured heavily around her social life.

=== Sam ===
Samantha Simpson (voiced by Claire Guyot in the French dub, Jennifer Hale (seasons 1–6) and Kira Riley (season 7–present) in the English dub) has long slightly wavy orange hair, emerald green eyes and fair skin; she dons a green catsuit on missions. She is described by her Télétoon and film profiles as rational, logical and mature, like a big sister, although she is known to easily become gullible at times, especially when it comes to romance. Sam is the smartest of the spies as she thinks up plans and diversions so that the girls can defeat the villains. Although she is fairly serious during her missions, she enjoys hanging out, shopping, and visiting salons. She is not as boy-crazy as the other girls; she has fallen for a few in the series, but without much success. One of the running gags is that she is frequently brainwashed. Her last name is not mentioned in her profiles, however, in "Do You Believe in Magic?", where she is undercover as a reporter, she introduces herself as Samantha Simpson. In an interview regarding Sam's development in the first three seasons, Hale described Sam as "smart and adventurous, but now you see more of her wacky side and her girly side as well."

=== Alex ===
Alexandra Casoy (voiced by Céline Mauge in the original French dub, Katie Leigh (seasons 1–2); Katie Griffin (seasons 3–6) and Lori Felipe-Barkin (season 7–present) in the English dub) has short black hair, light brown eyes, and dark skin; she dons a yellow catsuit on missions. (Note: According to her movie profile, Alex chose the yellow color for her spy uniform because it symbolizes strength.) She is described in the Télétoon profile as the best friend character, affectionate and not afraid to show her feelings. She enjoys sports and athletics but also shares her friends' fashion interests. She is the most naive and absent-minded of the three, sometimes interpreting figures of speech literally, often thinking it was actually going dark just because something is blocking her sight, or picking up and eating foodstuff at crime scenes that is potentially harmful. In the episode "Do You Believe In Magic", it is revealed Alex is the youngest of the three girls (and Sam the oldest). Her driving ability becomes a running gag in some episodes, despite the fact that she keeps getting to take the wheel and proves to be capable of improvising dangerous car stunts. She is sensitive and sometimes gets down on herself. Starting with season 3, Alex reveals interests in Taekwondo, skateboarding, soccer and video games. Alex appears to be racially mixed at first, having a dark-skinned mom and a white dad in the season 4 episode "Alex Gets Schooled"; however, her father later appears with a completely different physical appearance, notably with dark skin in the season 6 episode "Evil Ice Skater". One of the producers later confirmed Alex was of mixed Asian and Latin American descent. In Totally Spies! The Movie, which takes place when the girls first transfer to Beverly Hills High, she adopts a piglet whom she names Oinky, who does not appear in seasons 1 through 5 but recurs in season 6 when the girls have already gone to college. Although Alex says she is allergic to cats in season 1 episode "Wild Style", in "Evil Mascot", she handles Sigmund Smith's neglected kitten without any allergic reaction, and she later works in a university cat lab in season 6 episode "Nine Lives" without problems. Like Sam and Clover, her last name has never been revealed but in "Evil Ice Skater," Jerry refers to her father as "Dr. Casoy" but it's unknown if that's Alex's last name or not. In voicing Alex, Griffin used a higher vocal register than usual. She was worried about nodules developing and about being recast when the series returned for season 6 following a hiatus, but was happy when she could return. She found the part to be really fun, easy to play, and liked that Alex was so lovely to animals.

=== Jerry ===
Gerald James Lewis (voiced by Jean-Claude Donda in the French dub, Jess Harnell (seasons 1–2), Adrian Truss (seasons 3–6) and Gary Mack (season 7–present) in the English dub) is the founder and chief administrator of the World Organization Of Human Protection (WOOHP, pronounced like "whoop"), as the girls' supervisor. Jerry is a middle-aged British gentleman who briefs the girls on their missions and provides their various gadgets, most of which are in the form of women's accessories such as boots, hairpins, lipsticks, eyelash curlers, hair dryers, and are very mission-specific as if he knew everything beforehand. Some of the accessories are named with convoluted acronyms such as RASH ("Rocket-powered Amphibious Stealth Hydrofoil"), AWFUL Boots ("All-Weather Fleece Ultra-Light Boots"), or CATS ("Crystalline Airtight Trisect Shield"). He usually summons the girls (or "WOOHPs" them) using trap doors or portals from random items and places (such as a closet door, trash can, or vacuum cleaner), sends them off in similarly over-the-top manners (in roller coasters or rockets), most of which are practically impossible, or as noted by Sam, "sometimes defy the laws of physics". He also tends to make a lot of bad puns, which the girls sometimes find annoying. During the missions, he looks up information for the girls and analyzes items they send over. His movie profile notes that he cares a lot for the girls and acts like a second father to them. In the episode "Totally Switched", Jerry's last name is revealed to be Lewis.

Jerry also appears in the spin-off series The Amazing Spiez!.

=== Mandy ===
Mandy (voiced by Céline Mauge in the French dub, Jennifer Hale (seasons 1–6) and Sarah Naughton (season 7–present) in the English dub) is the girls' primary antagonist for their non-spy adventures starting at Beverly Hills High. She has long black hair and violet eyes, with a beauty mark under her left eye. The film website profiles her as the popular girl, charismatic, beautiful, and incredibly trendy and stylish as she is depicted as coming from a wealthy family. However, she is "the spies' worst nightmare – a pest that does everything to ridicule". She speaks with a high, squeaky voice with a nasal laugh. Her rivalry with Clover is most pronounced, as they often compete over boys, popularity, and bragging rights. Mandy will go out of her way to annoy the girls, especially Clover, and will even use dishonest means in order to do it, yet it usually backfires on her more than once. In the first four seasons, she is accompanied by her crony friends Dominique and Caitlin. In season 3, when the spies move into their home, Mandy ends up becoming their next-door neighbor. In season 5, she ends up attending college at Malibu University, where she shares a room with her cousin Mindy in the same dorm as the spy girls. In season 6, she employs an intern named Trent.

Despite frequently interacting with Clover and the girls, she is not aware that they are spies. In turn, the girls put up with Mandy's shenanigans and try to protect or rescue her when she is in serious danger from the real villains. Usually when she does discover they are spies, she gets her memory erased following the situation. Jerry makes her a WOOHP spy for the episode "Evil Coffee Shop Much?", and dons a purple uniform. Some episodes have her in a villainous role, such as: "Futureshock!" where she is the top media celebrity in an alternative future and tries to "Mandify" everyone and "Attack of the 50 Ft. Mandy" where she transforms into a giant and captures the other girls. In the multi-episode season finale "Totally Busted", she, Caitlin and Dominique are infected by a chemical called SUDS and become spy hunters or "spy-'ssassins". As of "Pandapocalypse", she has regained her full memory and is reluctantly rehired by WOOHP, subsequently resulting in her being transferred to Singapore with the Spies.

In an interview where she was asked about her impressions of Sam and Mandy, Hale said that she enjoyed voicing such opposite characters: "I love spy/action stuff and it always rocks when I get to be one of those characters. Plus I get to be a total snot, which is fun too."

== Recurring ==
=== G.L.A.D.I.S. ===
Short for Gadget Lending and Distribution Interactive System, G.L.A.D.I.S. (seasons 3–4; voiced by Laura Préjean in the French dub and Stevie Vallance in the English dub) is Jerry's new personal assistant that is introduced as a main character in season 3 and 4. Michel describes her as a "robot with a SERIOUS attitude". She takes the form of an assembly line with multiple robotic arms that can outfit the girls with the gadgets. Although Jerry created her, she often expresses her own attitude, picking out gadgets on her own and disobeying Jerry's orders. Following her disapproval by the show's fans, G.L.A.D.I.S. was written off the show, where it is mentioned in a season 5 episode that she is sent to a recycling facility.

=== Arnold Jackson ===
Arnold Jackson is a classmate who regularly shows up in the side stories at Beverly Hills High; he is portrayed as a nerd with glasses who has helped out the girls on the condition that they go on a date with him. In the series opener, he successfully campaigns for Clover to win a popularity contest, and gets to date her for a day, and in "A Spy Is Born" double-episode, he asks Sam out as a secret admirer with the initials "A.J." Despite being turned down "a few, uh, hundred times" by Clover, he is still attracted to her, and works on her publicity campaign in "Super Agent Much?"; he is also a member of Mandy's fan club. He participates in school events including the Halloween costume contest, Most Charitable Teen contest, local raves, student president elections, and the head cheerleader contest, the last of which he beats Mandy and Clover.

Arnold serves as the episodic villain In "Super Nerd Much?", where he acquires a magic ring that allows him to steal the "coolness" from other people. In the episode "Arnold the Great", he is inspired to dress as comic book superhero Admiral Admirable, but it is manipulated by villain Geraldine Husk into thinking the girls are his enemies. His final appearance was in the season 5 opener, "Evil Graduation" where, as class valedictorian, he tells the class off with a "Goodbye and good riddance!"

=== Blaine ===
Blaine is a Mali-U student introduced in the season 5 episode "The Granny" as the captain of the beach volleyball team. He is a freelance assassin whose mission to get Clover to fall in love with him, and then to kill her off. After realizing that Clover is working for the good side, he goes after his boss, revealed to be Geraldine Husk. He later joins WOOHP's Australian branch along with Britney. He appears in the season 5 finale "Totally Dunzo" where he is captured by Mr. X, but when he reunites with Clover, they almost kiss. In the season 6 episode "Baddies on a Blimp", he stows away on the WOOHP blimp to help out the spies when things go awry and the prisoners are released. However, he turns down Clover's affections, saying that he is done with dating LA girls after having dated the "high-maintenance" Mandy. Blaine makes a guest appearance in an episode of The Amazing Spiez! where he is abducted by the spiez' nanny.

=== Britney ===
Britney is introduced in the season 2 episode "Alex Quits" as a new teenage WOOHP spy. She has long dark blue hair, violet eyes, an olive complexion, and also dons a blue catsuit. Like Sam, Clover and Alex, she is also as fashion savvy and boy-crazy as any other girl can be and is beautiful like the other three. She quickly befriends Clover when she says that she is the captain of her high school's cheerleading squad, and Sam when she says she loves playing chess; however, her introduction to WOOHP and her immediate competence and leadership as an agent makes Alex jealous. Following the completion of the mission, Jerry announces that she has completed her training, and deploys her to another branch. She reappears in the season 3 episode "Escape from WOOHP Island" where she is forced on land on a prisoner's island, but is rescued by the girls as they team up again to re-capture the villains. She reveals that she has two agent co-workers, both of whom are good-looking guys.

Following Britney's appearance on "WOOHP Island", producer David Michel noted she would reappear in some special episodes. In the season 5 episode "Virtual Stranger" she gets stuck in a virtual simulation as the result of an accident, causing a cyber demon using her as a host to manifest as three incarcerated villains in the real world. After being freed by the spy girls, she transfers to Mali-U for three more episodes, causing Alex to become jealous of her again. In the episode "WOOHPersize-me", the four girls (including Britney herself) discover that a new exercise trend has been going around campus, and it involves moves taught at WOOHP. Jerry has them track down who's responsible. "Evil Hotel", Britney and Alex become friends again, having common interests such as their favorite movie actor who they are assigned to protect. Britney is assigned to WOOHP Australia and partnered with Blaine, much to Clover's disdain. She returns in the multi-episode finale "Totally Dunzo" as one of the spies captured by Mr. X. Britney makes a guest appearance in an episode of The Amazing Spiez where she is abducted by the spiez' nanny.

=== Carmen Casoy ===
Carmen (voiced by Katie Leigh) is Alex's mother. She has a darker skin/eye tone and originally her hair was dark brown but has since appeared the same color as Alex's. Her main goal and focus is for Alex to get a boyfriend. Carmen made an appearance in the Season 2 episode "Mommies Dearest", the Season 4 episode "Alex Gets Schooled", and her final appearance in the Season 4 finale "Totally Busted". During her short duration as a spy, her catsuit is royal blue. At the end of that episode, she becomes an official spy. She looks identical to her daughter.

=== David ===
David Finch is a classmate who manages to garner the romantic affections of all three of the spy girls (and Mandy). He is introduced in the season 2 episode "It's How You Play The Game". He has many varied interests such as painting and poetry, but also dabbles in extreme sports such as rock climbing and street luge. He is oblivious to the girls' attempts to garner his attention and thinks of them as just friends, or like a sister. In his interviews when producer David Michel was asked if he could share some inside jokes that were put into episodes, he said: "In season II, guess what's the name of the totally hunky, totally clever boy that the 3 girls fall in love with at the same time? David." When asked about why David did not return in the third season, Michel said, "David never was a recurring character. He was present in a few season II episodes so we didn't have to justify his not being in our stories anymore. But we have realized how important he is to the fans, and decided to have him back in season 4."

=== Dean ===
Dean is a WOOHP agent who first appears in the season 3 multi-episode finale "Evil Promotion Much?" where he and the girls undergo special training to become super spies. He wears a blue uniform. Ever since he was a baby he has demonstrated exceptional agility and was recruited to join WOOHP. Following the first day of the super spy training, he is captured by Terence and used as ransom in order for the girls to eliminate Jerry and steal his microchip. He briefly sides with Terence when the girls return but then reveals he has been siding with WOOHP all along, and that he is the actual training instructor. He then helps the girls rescue Jerry and defeat Terence. He was later shown in "Deja Cruise" where he pretends to be a lifeguard who turns down Clover's advances. He returns in "WOOHP-tastic!" where he is put in charge of the WOOHP gadget lab. In the season 5 finale, he is one of the agents who was abducted by Mr. X.

He also appears in the spin-off series The Amazing Spiez!.

=== Dominique and Caitlin ===
Dominique and Caitlin (voiced by Katie Griffin and Andrea Baker) are Mandy's two crony friends who accompany her at school and other events. Both have snobby attitudes and high nasal voice inflections like their leader. They were not given names in the first two seasons. According to the profile on Mandy in the feature film, although they support Mandy, the latter is too selfish to care for them. Dominique has dark red hair styled in way similar to Alex's hair, blue eyes, and peach skin. They only appeared scarcely in episodes of the first four seasons, and the movie, when the story was set at Beverly Hills High; when the story was shifted to set at Mali-U starting from season 5, they were written off entirely. Their most notable appearance was in the "Totally Busted" arc of season 4, in which they were brainwashed along with Mandy and actively attacked the Spies.

In portraying the girls, Baker said that she and Griffin both tried to do their own versions of Mandy.

=== Gabby Simpson ===
Gabby is Sam's mother. She wears her orange hair long like Sam's, though slightly curlier. Gabby's hair was originally brown, but it has since appeared the same color as Sam's. Gabby can be overprotective of Sam and only has her best safety in mind. Gabby's first appearance was in the Season 2 episode "Mommies Dearest". She reappears in her second appearance in the Season 4 finale "Totally Busted". During her short duration as a spy, her catsuit is jade-colored. At the end of that episode, she becomes an official spy. She looks identical to her daughter. Sam is Gabby's only child. Gabby made a brief appearance in "The Wedding Crasher".

=== Mindy ===
Mindy is Mandy's cousin who appears in season 5 as a student at Mali-U. She has blonde hair, green eyes, a tan complexion, and speaks in a strong Southern accent, acting very much like a second Mandy, to annoy the girls for the season. She and Mandy room together in the same dorm as the spy girls.

=== Mrs. Lewis ===
Jerry's mother who lives in Devonshire, England. Her first appearance is in the season 2 episode "Mommies Dearest". She gets very annoyed with her son, who tells her that he is a hotel manager. In the season 5 finale "Totally Dunzo!" she becomes evil after a drop of evil DNA falls into her cup of tea. She becomes "Mr. X" and creates robot droids to replace the spies after buying out WOOHP as a way to take over the world. After Jerry manages to reverse the effects, she returns to normal. It is revealed that she was a top spy back in her youth, something Jerry never knew. In the season 6 episode "Totally Switched Again" she becomes a WOOHP spy, donning a lilac catsuit, but retires again at the end of the episode. Mrs. Lewis has also appeared in the spin-off series The Amazing Spiez! when her daughter Sherry has a flashback in "Operation WOOSCI".

=== Norman ===
Norman is Clover's cousin. He first appears in the season 2 episode "Zooney World" and is seen again in the Season 6 episode "Danger TV".

=== Oinky ===
Oinky is Alex's pet pig. He wears a blue diamond-studded collar with a gold tag, and even though he is hairless, he has a small spot which resembles a small lock of hair on his forehead. In Totally Spies! The Movie, which takes place when the girls first transfer to Beverly Hills High, he was one of the pets in cages when the giant sushi roll bounced off the cages, breaking them, and setting the animals free. The giant sushi roll, with the three girls log rolling on top of it, chased him to the street, where he got trapped between the traffic and the incoming giant sushi roll, and began to cry for help. Alex saved his life, then he imprinted on her. Alex adopted the pig and named him Oinky.

=== Phoebe ===
Phoebe is Mandy's mother who also has long black hair, violet eyes, and speaks with a nasal-pitched voice. She first appears in the season 3 episode "Forward to the Past" where, in 1975, she wears hippie clothing and had worked on the school news magazine at Beverly Hills High. She has a few appearances later in the season such as the episode "Dental? More Like Mental", where she disciplines Mandy for her poor grades by not only grounding her but also withholding her platinum credit card. In the episode "Evil G.L.A.D.I.S Much?", she refuses to help Mandy buy out the Yves Mont Blanc store.

=== Plunkett ===
Professor Plunkett is the spies' fashion design instructor at Malibu University. He is a regular character in season 6, and has high expectations of Clover, especially in the episode "Inferior Designer" where he gives only one A for a midterm runway project. In the season finale, "So Totally Versailles", he leads the class on a field trip to France.

=== Stella Ewing ===
Stella is Clover's mother, who looks just like Clover but originally with lighter hair until later with the same hair color tone as her daughter's. She appears in the season 2 episodes "Mommies Dearest", where she is controlled by Tim Scam, and "Zooney World", where she asks Clover to take care of Clover's cousin Norman. In the season 4 finale "Totally Busted", she becomes a spy and her catsuit is hot pink. In the season 6 episode "Nine Lives", it is revealed that she is an earlobe surgeon.

=== Trent ===
Trent is Mandy's intern who debuts as a regular character in season 6. He drives Mandy around in a golf cart, and does errands such as buying her drinks and magazines, carrying her shopping bags, and shading and fanning her in the heat. He wears a dress shirt with a black vest and slacks. He serves as the episodic villain in "Trent Goes Wild" where, during his memory wipe at WOOHP, he accidentally absorbs the DNA of an evil scorpion man. He then becomes a cool dude at Mali-U, and takes revenge against Mandy for the abuse she has laid on him.

=== Virgil ===
Virgil is the supervisor at the coffee store where Alex, Sam, and Clover take on part-time jobs in season 5. He first appears in "Evil Professor". He appears in several episodes including "The Show Must Go On... Or Else" where he is transformed to become an actor in a western, In "Zero To Hero", he asks out Alex, who considers him just a friend. When the date goes terribly wrong because of his clumsiness and bad luck, he later discovers the girls are spies and uses a serum to bulk up in order to be a superhero, concocting dangerous situations where he can save her.

=== Zerlina ===
Zerlina Lewis (season 7; voiced by Déborah Claude in the French dub, and by Alana Barrett-Atkins in the English dub) is Jerry's daughter and the new president of WOOHP following her father's retirement.

=== Toby ===
Toby (season 7; voiced by Gauthier Battoue in the French dub and Arjun Biju in the English dub) is a young high-tech genius that assists Zerlina in the creation and distribution of the girls' gadgets.

=== Glitterstar ===
Glitterstar (season 7; voiced by Geneviève Battoue in the French dub and Jody Doo in the English dub) is the manager of Bubble Spy Cafe, run by WOOHP, the World Organization Of Human Protection. Despite this, she does not know of the girls' secret spy life.

== Recurring villains ==
Many villains began making return appearances starting with the second season. In another interview, Michel said that in the third season there is an episode called "Escape from WOOHP Island" in which some of the past villains reappear. Most of them broke out of the WOOHP detention facility, or in the case of Jazz Hands, he was simply released after finishing doing his time. In season 4, Terence rounds up some of the villains to form an organization called League Aiming to Menace and Overthrow Spies (LAMOS), of which their members include Tim Scam, Helga Von Guggen, Myrna Beesbottom, and Boogie Gus. In season 6, some villains from earlier seasons, such as the Granny, also returned; one exception was Seth Toyman, who was portrayed as an unwitting perpetrator in season 2, now as a villain with a different backstory and motive.

=== Boogie Gus ===
Boogie Gus is an afro-wearing guy who first appears in the season 3 episode "Forward to the Past" where he uses Jerry's time machine invention to travel back and forth to steal technology from the future and bring it back to his groovy 1970s past where he creates his own WOOHP organization: World Organization Of Harming People. It is revealed that he was actually from the present as a former WOOHP janitor.

In season 4, he joins LAMOS where he still sports his 1970s look. In one of the episodes, he uses a ray gun to transform people to a younger version of themselves but dressed in 1980s fashion.

In the double-episode "Like, So Totally Not Spies", he accidentally leaks the information regarding Terence's plans and the secret behind the bracelets to the girls.

Boogie Gus has also appeared in the spinoff series The Amazing Spiez! where his son Gus Jr. has a passion for the decade he was born, the 1990s, which included low-tech electronics and ghetto-based outfits. They try to turn everything back to the way it was in the 1990s but are stopped by the spiez.

=== Candy Sweet ===
Margeret "Candy Sweet" Nussbaum (voiced by Amanda Anka) is introduced as a coach in the episode "The Black Widows" where her cheerleading squad makes a strong impression in the national competitions. However, it is later revealed that her team is made up of gynoids who have been programmed with the cheerleading routines stolen from the other teams. It is revealed that she was a former student named Margaret Nussbaum who had been rejected by the Honeybees cheerleading team, and has since vowed to have her revenge.

In "Sis-KaBOOM-Bah!" she brainwashes teenage cheerleaders nationwide (including Clover and Mandy) with a small training DVD so they can break her out of prison.

=== Diminutive Smalls ===
Tired of being looked down upon, Diminutive Smalls invented a shrink ray to shrink others down to his liking, but the machine backfired and shrank him instead. However, he was able to attain incredible strength in the process. In the episode "Shrinking", he uses the ray to shrink major tourist attractions.

In the episode "Attack of the 50 Foot Mandy", he tried to seek revenge by enlarging the spies, only to miss and hit Mandy instead.

=== Dr. Gelee ===
Gelee is a scientist who appears in "Ice Man Cometh". Deciding that mankind was too evil and destructive to the planet, he plans to eliminate everyone by freezing the planet while he and his henchmen hole up in his mountain fortress. He chooses Clover to be his ice queen, and forces her to play a game of chess with him, but is foiled by the girls and sent to prison.

However, in "Ski Trip", he escapes and follows the girls to a ski resort where he tries to kill them off in a series of accidents. When he kidnaps Clover, he mistakenly grabs Mandy instead because she wears a red snow outfit that resembles Clover's spy suit. Regardless, he uses Mandy as a hostage to capture the girls. He is last seen at the side of the mountain where he tries to fire a laser at the girls, only to have it bounce off and cause an avalanche that buries him, but it is unknown if the avalanche killed him or not.

=== Geraldine Husk ===
Geraldine Husk (voiced by Kathy Laskey.) first appears as the founder and head of a spy agency called Super Protection International (S.P.I.), which during its introduction, becomes extremely successful in capturing criminals, and practically puts WOOHP out of business. However, it is later revealed that she has been using her S.P.I. employees to act as the criminals in fake arrests in order to upstage WOOHP and get her revenge from being rejected from joining WOOHP when she was younger. Geraldine was later foiled by Clover, Sam, and Alex, and she swore revenge against them.

In "Super Agent Much?", Geraldine places a serum in Clover's coffee which transforms Clover into a "super spy", with enhanced superhuman abilities and powers, while becoming more selfish. She ultimately recruits Clover to join SPI and orders her to kill her friends and destroy WOOHP. However, after being thrown in the lake, Clover's bionic abilities are disabled and Geraldine was again captured. In "Arnold the Great", she tries to ensnare the girls but ends up targeting Arnold instead, giving him some superhero powers. In the season 5 episode "Return Of Geraldine", she is revealed to have hired Blaine to kill Clover, and upon Blaine's failure, changes her goal to make Clover's life miserable.

=== Granny ===
Granny is the title character in the episode "The Granny", appearing like a sweet woman in her 80s who likes to bake goodies. In the episode, she is a WOOHP prisoner considered to be very dangerous, but the girls fall for her pleasant personality. She escapes when the girls were trying to transport her to another facility, and reunites with her gang to rob the city's banks but is ultimately foiled by the girls and sent to another prison facility that is more like a retirement resort.

In a follow-up episode "Super Sweet Cupcake Company", she bakes cupcakes that make their consumers compliant to her commands. She escapes prison and uses the cupcakes to rob banks without the bank staff aware of any wrongdoing.

She would return in two episodes of the Amazing Spiez episodes "Operation Old School" and "Operation Senior Spy".

=== Captain Hayes ===
Captain Hayes Turner (voiced by Ian James Corlett) is obsessed with celebrities. He first appears in "Evil Airlines Much?" where he captains a luxury airplane that transports celebrities from Los Angeles to Paris, France. However, it is soon revealed that he plans on keeping the airplane in the skies forever.

He returns in "Evil Hotel", where he has escaped from prison and creates an underwater luxury hotel with a very exclusive VIP list. Hoping to fill the hotel with celebrities that he has kidnapped, he also devises equipment to raise the sea level of the world's oceans.

In the season 6 episode "Celebrity Swipe", instead of trapping celebrities at a location, he abducts them and steals their attributes that made them famous so he can become a celebrity himself.

=== Helga Von Guggen ===
Helga Van Guggen (voiced by Adrienne Barbeau) is a fashion designer whom Clover notes as an icon in the industry. In the season 1 episode, "Wild Style", she masterminds the abduction of cruise ship passengers along with her assistant Troad where she makes a serum that transforms people into animal-like creatures in order to harvest their fur coats. When she clashes with the spy girls, she is knocked into her own serum by one of the animal-like creatures and transforms into a massive hybrid monster. She is defeated, captured, and restored to normal offscreen.

She returns in the season 2 episode "Fashion Faux Pas" where, having broken out of prison, she hatches a scheme where she creates a fashion line called Mystique whose clothing becomes popular, but in reality it will constrict its users to death when activated.

She reappear in the season 4 as a member of LAMOS. In the episode "Evil Jerry", she is arrested, but escapes and returns in the double episode "Like, So Totally Not Spies" where she and the rest of LAMOS conspire against WOOHP by giving out bracelets that make the spy girls forget their spy history.

==== Troad ====
Troad is the right-hand man of Helga Von Guggen. In his first appearance in "Wild Style, he posed as a shipwrecked castaway.

In "Fashion Faux Pas", Troad assisted Helga in her Mystique fashion line. He was not seen again after that.

=== Jazz Hands ===
Jazz Hands (voiced by Ben Joseph) is a mime artist who wears an old-fashioned black tuxedo, cape, wine-colored tight pants and top hat. Although he is dressed as a mime, he often speaks, explaining elaborate plans of turning everyone into mime slaves. He despises entertainers such as singers and comedians because they have rendered his practice obsolete and forgotten. His weapon of choice is an accordion outfitted with a cannon that shoots lasers that transform people into voiceless mimes and turns their clothes black and white. In "Mime Your Own Business", he zaps Sam and Alex and attempts to zap folks all over Beverly Hills. In season 5, he has a three-episode story arc where he is released from WOOHP prison and devises a mime-based theme park where he converts visitors into a mime army. He befriends a fellow mime named Miss Spirit Fingers and commissions her to steal a high-tech microchip. However, he later learns that Miss Spirit Fingers is Sam in disguise, and converts her to his cause.

Ben Joseph also co-wrote the episode in which Jazz Hands debuted.

=== Marco Lumière ===
The villain of the two-part episode "A Spy Is Born", Lumière (voiced by Dee Baker in season 1, James Brown Jr. in season 7) is an eccentric Hollywood director who became an outcast from the mainstream film community for his bizarre, often sadistic methods. In revenge, he concocted a scheme where he kidnaps the biggest Hollywood stars and takes them to his private island, filled with various killer robots and death traps. There, the actors would star in Lumière's own personal action movie where all the dangers and deaths would be real. Following his defeat at the island, he is arrested but escapes the WOOHP plane taking him into custody, kidnapping Alex and forcing the girls to participate in his new action film. He is eventually defeated by the girls and Jerry.

He returns in the episode "0067", where he escapes prison and uses plastic surgery and the alias "Ocram Ereimul" to impersonate an A-list movie producer to manipulate Jerry into capturing Hollywood's top producers.

He reappeared in season 7 episode "Totally Trolling, Much?". It revealed that he had already been released from prison and was no longer a villain. He also has a daughter named Shirley Lumiere.

=== Myrna Beesbottom ===
Myrna Beesbottom is a former WOOHP agent who is introduced in the season 3 episode "Space Much?" where she is assigned to be the girls' nanny which lasts for the duration of that episode. She wears a maid uniform and is very strict on the girls.

She reappears as a villain in the episode "Evil Valentine's Day" where she puts a ring on Jerry's finger that causes him to fall in love with her. Jerry and Myrna marry, however, it is revealed that she did so in order to take over WOOHP headquarters.

In the season 4 opener episode "The Dream Teens", she joins LAMOS and develops plasma androids who act as the spies' boyfriends with the purpose of draining the girls' energy. Despite her large build, Myrna is very agile and strong, with familiarity in ninja martial arts and weapons.

=== Sebastian Saga ===
Sebastian Saga (voiced by Jim Ward.) is the first villain to appear in the series. He is introduced as the manager for fledgling rock star Ricky Mathis. A former guitar player, he was severely injured in a freak pyrotechnics accident that destroyed his career and left him with a metal prosthetic glove for his missing left hand. In addition, he had to style his hair so as to conceal the left side of his face. In the series' first episode "A Thing for Musicians", he uses hypnotic music in the form of glowing microdisc CDs during Mathis's performances to control the crowd and to incite them into attacking the world's governments. However, the spy girls foil his plans when they redirected the disc's brainwashing powers to him, rendering him catatonic long enough for him to be found and imprisoned.

He returns in "Stark Raving Mad" where he has escaped from prison (apparently, his escape wasn't noticed) and acts as a DJ at the local raves where he turns the girls' peers into angry rioters to trash the girls' favorite places such as the skating rink, the art museum, the Beverly Hills mall, and ultimately their high school.

He would later return in The Amazing Spiez episode "Operation: Tami Trouble".

=== Terence Lewis ===
Terence Lewis is Jerry's evil twin brother and the primary arch-nemesis starting in the multiple-episode season 3 finale, "Evil Promotion Much?". In that episode, he facilitates the training for the girls so that they can become super spies. At first, Terence appeared to be an easy-going, relaxed administrator, but soon turns against them. His underlying motive is that he was betrayed by his brother when they were copying each other's answers during an exam. He then had his face and voice surgically altered.

In season 4, he creates an organization called League Aiming to Menace and Overthrow Spies (L.A.M.O.S.), made up of WOOHP villains from previous episodes. During their first meeting, he discovers the silliness of the acronym, but as he had already purchased merchandise with the brand, he keeps it as is. He wears a white curly wig and runs the group from a leaky submarine where they serve as recurring villains for several episodes.

He also makes an appearance in the episode "Scary Jerry" on the spinoff show The Amazing Spiez!.

=== Tim Scam ===
Tim Scam is a psychotic, narcissistic, and sociopathic mastermind with destructive plans for the world and WOOHP. He first appears in "The New Jerry" episode, where he kidnaps Jerry, dumps him somewhere and replaces him at WOOHP, going under a fake name "Mac Smit" and created a fake video about Jerry's retirement. He gives the girls assignments but secretly tries to kill them. He is later revealed to be a former WOOHP weapons technician who developed a heat-ray capable of evaporating the Earth's oceans; he ultimately got fired by Jerry for illegal use of WOOHP weapons and seeks revenge on the organization. In "Mommies Dearest" he escaped from jail and attempted to get revenge on the girls by mind-controlling their mothers and using them to kill the girls. In "Morphing is so 1987" Tim attempts to destroy WOOHP using T-1000 robots capable of mimicking the appearance of others. He reappears in season 4 as a member of LAMOS.

=== Manny Wong ===
Manny Wong is a former manicurist whose salon went out of business when the automated salon Mega Mani Mania came into view. First seen in "Mani-Maniac Much?", Wong sought revenge on Mega Mani Mania only to be defeated and imprisoned.

He returns in "Baddies on a Blimp" to take revenge by working with Yves Mont Blanc and Violet Vanderfleet.

=== Violet Vanderfleet ===
Violet Vanderfleet is a botanist who appears in "Evil Bouquets Are So Passe". She develops a hybrid of poisonous plants that are able to move on their own and knock out their targets with sleeping gas. In the episode, she delivers the plants to all the guys who have dumped her, and plans to use the flowers to destroy all of the men in the world and to stand up for all the heartbroken girls. She is eventually stopped when one of the plants catches a strand of her hair and attacks her, putting her to sleep until WOOHP arrests her and undoes the effects with an antidote.

She returns in the episode "Baddies on a Blimp" where she, Manny Wong and Yves Mont Blanc are accidentally released and take over the WOOHP blimp.

=== Willard ===
Willard (voiced by Dee Baker in season one, Jamie Watson in season 3) is a scientist first appearing in the season 2 episode "Alex Quits". He despises anything that moves too quickly, recalling remarks from his past such as not getting a raise because of working too slow, or not making the track team because of running too slow. After years of failed cloning research, he develops a ray gun that slows down the molecules of its targets, putting them in a state of slow motion.

In the season 3 episode "Escape from WOOHP Island", he orchestrates an escape attempt of WOOHP prisoners by employing a different ray gun to bring down Britney's plane, and then disguises himself as her in order to kill the spies and take their plane. However, the spies unmask him, forcing him to attack directly. Although he dislikes speed, his martial arts technique is quick, although not as fast as Britney's.

Following "WOOHP Island", he has appeared as a background character in episodes involving WOOHP prisoners.

=== Yves Mont Blanc ===
Yves Mont Blanc is a shoe designer who has been referenced in multiple episodes and as Clover's favorite shoe designer. In "Evil Shoe Designer", he abducts fashion critics who have responded negatively to his latest designs and forces them to wear boots that comply with his commands.

He also appears in the episode "Baddies on a Blimp" where helps Manny Wong and Violet Vanderfleet take over the WOOHP blimp.

== Works cited ==
Totally Spies! episodes
