= Puzzle Museum =

Coordinates: 52°57′49.09″N 5°49′53.59″E

- Established: 2008
- Location: De Brekken 6-13 Joure, Netherlands
- Type: Museum
- Website: www.puzzelmuseum.nl

The Puzzle Museum is a museum in Joure in The Netherlands. It can be visited by appointment. The museum features 50,000 Mathematical puzzles, brain teasers, and riddles. Jigsaw puzzles are not part of the collection.

== Collection ==
The collection comprises over 50,000 puzzles, the oldest dating back to 1900. Only a selection of the collection is on display; a large portion is in storage. The display cases showcase a variety of vintage puzzles, nostalgic boxes, and company advertising puzzles. One of the exhibits is dedicated to optical illusions. Examples of optical illusions, tricks, and language jokes hang on the walls. The collection also includes puzzle types such as tangrams, sliding puzzles, construction puzzles, metal puzzles, Rubik's cubes, as well as patience games, Peg solitaire, tic-tac-toe, and Nine men's morris. The collection includes 18,000 sliding puzzles, including many about M. C. Escher's work.

The extensive collection of puzzle books also includes the complete series of Winterboeken, published between 1939 and 1975 by Margriet. Other puzzles include search pictures, optical illusions, rebuses, and proverbs.

== Auke Reijenga ==
The museum on the De Ekers industrial estate was founded by Auke Reijenga (born 1960) from Joure. He received his first sliding puzzle when he was six years old. His collection quickly expanded due to the Rubik's Cube craze. Among the museum artifacts is a set of ancient Chinese rings from his grandmother. In 2008, the two-story company building on De Brekken was opened by Frisian deputy Jannewietske de Vries. Visitors can solve puzzles themselves on the ground floor, and owner Reijenga, as a clown and magician, provides entertainment. Examples that at first glance seem impossible to solve are discussed. Reijenga gave up his teaching job in 2013 to dedicate himself to the Puzzle Museum and performing.
