= Vincent Chalvon-Demersay =

French animator and retired producer (born 1964)

Vincent Demersay
- Born: Vincent Chalvon-Demersay; 23 February 1964 (age 62); Paris, France
- Occupation: Producer
- Years active: 1991–2013

Vincent Chalvon-Demersay (born 23 February 1964) is a French retired producer. He was born in Paris and is the creator of the animated series Totally Spies!, Martin Mystery, REDAkAI, Team Galaxy, Monster Buster Club and The Amazing Spiez!. He joined Marathon Media along with David Michel in 1999. In 2013, he stepped down as the CEO of Marathon Media for undisclosed "personal reasons".
