= Jennifer Hale =

Canadian voice actress

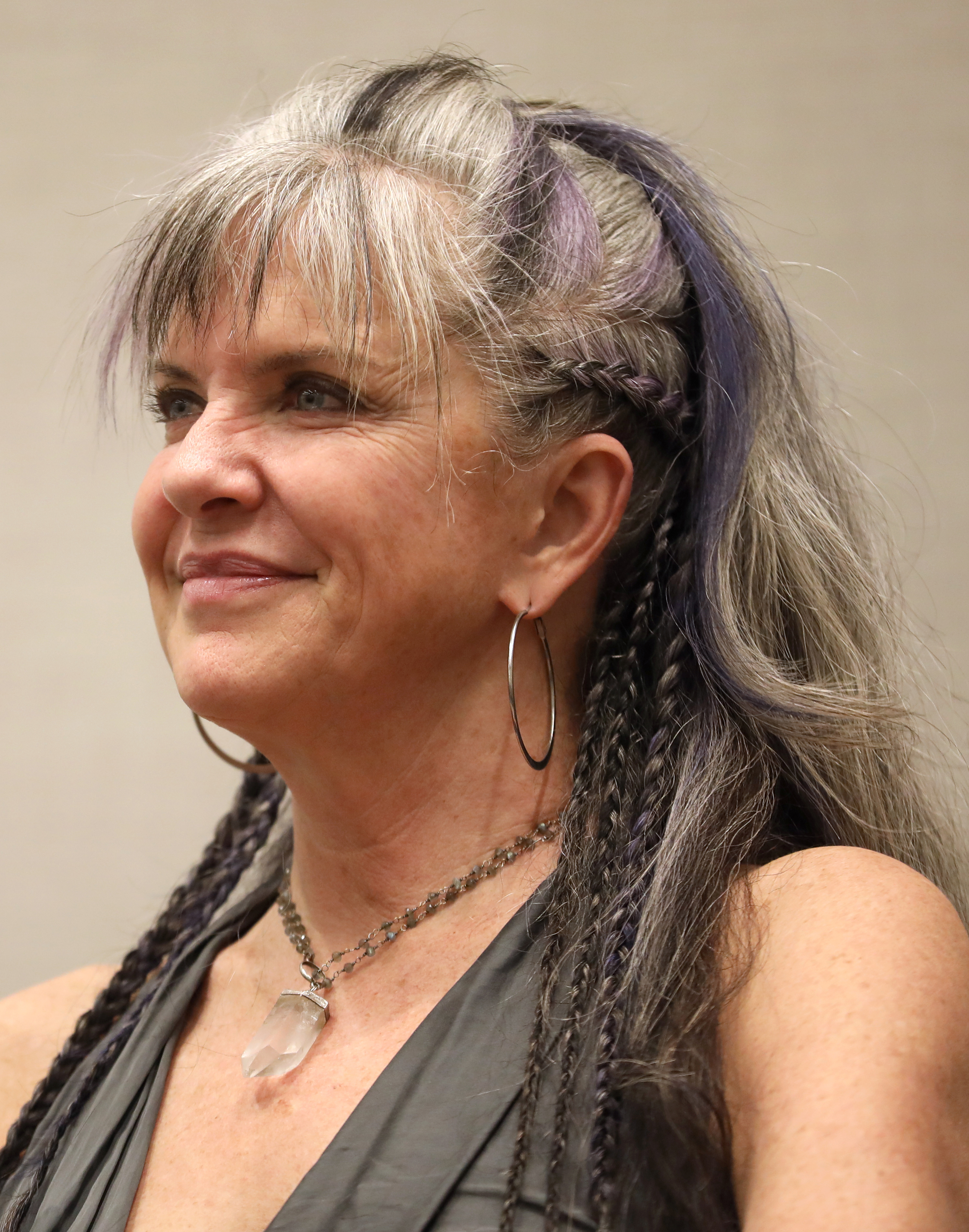
- Hale in March 2024
- Born: Happy Valley-Goose Bay, Newfoundland and Labrador, Canada
- Other name: Carren Learning
- Citizenship: Canada; United States
- Occupation: Voice actress
- Years active: 1988–present
- Children: 1
- Website: jenniferhale.com

Jennifer Hale, also known as Carren Learning, is a Canadian and American voice actress. She is well known for her work in video game franchises such as Baldur's Gate, Mass Effect, Metal Gear Solid, BioShock Infinite, Metroid Prime, Halo, Overwatch, and Star Wars: Knights of the Old Republic. In 2013, she was recognized by Guinness World Records as the most prolific female video game voice actor, which she held until it was broken by Lani Minella in 2024.

Hale is featured in animation such as The Real Adventures of Jonny Quest, The Powerpuff Girls, Codename: Kids Next Door, The Grim Adventures of Billy & Mandy, Brandy & Mr. Whiskers, Totally Spies!, Avatar: The Last Airbender and its continuation The Legend of Korra, Where on Earth Is Carmen Sandiego? and Star Wars: The Clone Wars. She also voices Thorn of the Hex Girls in various Scooby-Doo movies and TV episodes, as well as Cinderella and Princess Aurora in various Disney Princess media of the 2000s and 2010s. She is also known for voicing Jean Grey in a variety of Marvel media, most recently in X-Men '97 (2024–present).

For her role as Commander Shepard, Hale was nominated for "Best Performance by a Human Female" twice at the 2010 and 2012 Spike Video Game Awards, as well as "Outstanding Achievement in Character Performance" at the 16th Annual D.I.C.E. Awards. In 2022, she was nominated for "Performer in a Leading Role" at the 18th British Academy Games Awards, as well as "Outstanding Achievement in Character" at the 25th Annual D.I.C.E. Awards, for her performance as Rivet in Ratchet & Clank: Rift Apart.

== Early life ==
Hale was born in Happy Valley-Goose Bay. (Note: Although Hale's year of birth was reported as 1972 in an interview with Tom Bissell of The New Yorker, her description of being in the class of 1982 of the Alabama School of Fine Arts suggests an earlier birth year.) Her mother was what she called "a wandering master's degree pursuer" and her stepfather was a microbiologist. She later told Tom Bissell of The New Yorker that her biological father, James Learning (1938-2020), was an outdoorsman who was also a prominent NunatuKavut elder and environmental activist. Hale herself is a member of NunatuKavut, and self-identifies as being of partial southern Labrador Inuit descent. She would later call for support to free her father, who had advanced cancer, after he was imprisoned for refusing to sign an injunction to stay away from Muskrat Falls in 2017. Hale has a paternal half-sister, Carren Dujela, who works at the University of Victoria. She moved to the U.S. as a child and grew up in Alabama, mainly in Birmingham and Montgomery.

When Hale was a teenager, she got a voice-over spot at a local radio station, being paid $35 just to talk. In 1982, she graduated from Alabama School of Fine Arts, where she was in the theater department and was interested in being in a rock band. She stated, "I started doing voice-over to pay for life and a PA system and everything else, and ended up that just sort of took over, acting took over." While in high school, she did more voice-over work for commercials, and also worked as a production assistant at age 17. She attended Birmingham–Southern College, where she found the program's style was broader than what she wanted to do, and realized that she was more interested in film acting than theater acting. She graduated with a business degree. She began working as an actress and continued doing voice-overs, commuting frequently between Birmingham and Atlanta, Georgia.

== Career ==
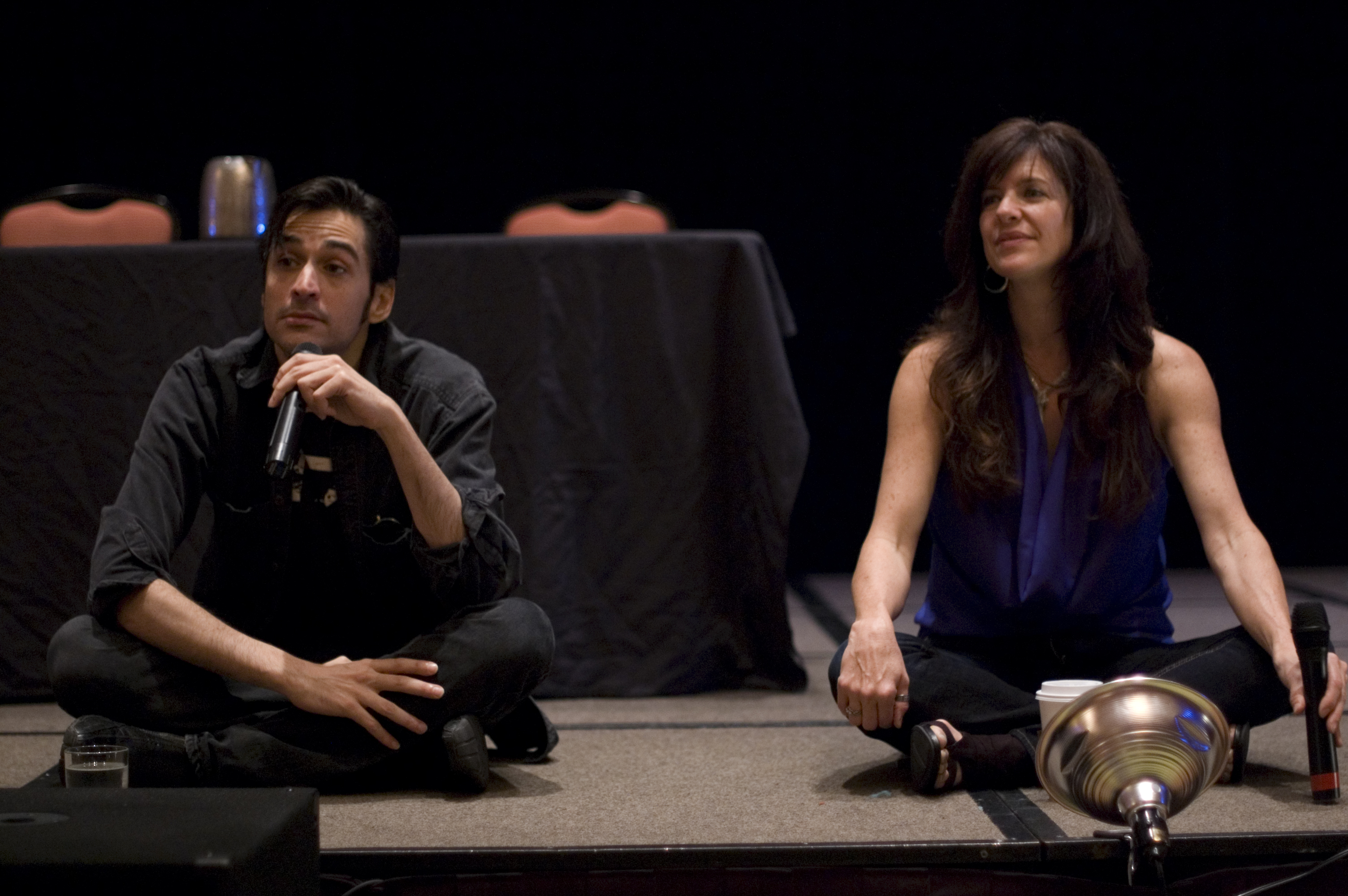
Hale with fellow Commander Shepard voice actor Mark Meer in 2011

Hale's first big break in acting was in 1988 for the made-for-television movie A Father's Homecoming, which was an NBC movie of the week. She was also selected among a group of about six thousand girls in a nationwide search to be in several episodes of the Santa Barbara soap opera television series. After doing more regional work, she eventually moved to Los Angeles, where she took on sporadic guest roles typical for young actresses on shows such as Melrose Place, ER, and Charmed. Her first major voice-over role in cartoons was the main character Ivy in Where on Earth Is Carmen Sandiego? which was based on the computer game series. As it was her first cartoon, she sought extra classes and training. The show spanned multiple seasons until its final broadcast in 1999. Hale enjoyed the project and noted that it was one of the first network TV cartoons that met the educational requirements. Hale's next animation project was Skeleton Warriors where "there were ten cast members, [two] of whom were girls, and we blew stuff up and cartoon maimed each other every week."

The development of a tie-in video game for Carmen Sandiego gave Hale the opportunity to do her first ever voice-over for a video game. She describes her time with the game as a "really confusing experience" as it required a lot more lines and time than the show did. Her next major video game was with BioWare on their Baldur's Gate series on various roles, which would eventually lead to large roles in Mass Effect and other titles. She has been involved in many other cartoons. In 1994, she was cast as Felicia Hardy/Black Cat in Spider-Man: The Animated Series, the first in a long line of Marvel Comics characters she has voiced. She plays Cinderella and Princess Aurora in various Disney projects, as well as voicing Dory from Finding Nemo throughout the Disney parks, filling in for Ellen DeGeneres. In 2003, Hale voiced Mrs. Little in the short-lived Stuart Little TV series.

Hale has provided the voice of lead character Sam and rival character Mandy in the French animated television series Totally Spies!. In a 2004 interview, she said "I'm so happy that David Michel (creator and producer), Jamie Simone (voice director) and everyone gave me the opportunity to be part of the show, it's been one of my absolute favorite experiences." She describes Sam as "smart and adventurous, but now you see more of her wacky side and her girly side as well," and Mandy as a "total snot, which is fun too." She voiced the two characters as well as others for the show's six seasons and its feature movie.

Hale voiced Bastila Shan in Star Wars: Knights of the Old Republic and returned for a brief appearance in the sequel Star Wars: Knights of the Old Republic II – The Sith Lords. She later voiced the female version of Jaden Korr in Star Wars: Jedi Knight: Jedi Academy. In the BioWare MMOPRG Star Wars: The Old Republic, Hale voiced the Republic Trooper Female as well as the recurring NPC Jedi Grand Master Satele Shan. Hale interpreted the voices of Fall-From-Grace and Deionarra in the role-playing computer game Planescape: Torment. She is also known as the "voice" of Samus Aran in the first three games of the Metroid Prime series, providing grunts and screams as the player moves and takes damage. Hale is also known for playing several voices in the Metal Gear Solid series (Naomi Hunter in Metal Gear Solid and Metal Gear Solid 4: Guns of the Patriots, and Emma Emmerich in Metal Gear Solid 2: Sons of Liberty).

Hale was also the voice of Jean Grey in Wolverine and the X-Men and Marvel vs. Capcom 3: Fate of Two Worlds as well as a small role in Swat Kats. She also voiced British mercenary Jennifer Mui in Mercenaries: Playground of Destruction and Mercenaries 2: World in Flames. In 2011, she was the voice of Ms. Marvel (Carol Danvers) on Avengers: Earth's Mightiest Heroes. She provided the voice of Leah in Diablo III, and appeared as Rosalind Lutece in BioShock Infinite. Hale also played the role of Krem in BioWare's Dragon Age: Inquisition. She also provided the voice for Kronika, the final boss of Mortal Kombat 11.

Hale was selected to voice Commander Shepard, the main player character in the Mass Effect series. She had said that she is very invested in helping to "create" the stories of video games, though she herself is not a gamer. Although Hale does object to certain lines if they seem out-of-character in other works, she prefers not to mess with the words for Shepard and BioWare. Although reports showed that only 18% of players chose to play as a female Shepard in Mass Effect 2, (32% in Mass Effect Legendary Edition) vocal support for her character was high, leading to the fan-driven nickname "FemShep" and an e-mail campaign to put her character on the cover of Mass Effect 3. She was nominated for "Best Performance by a Human Female" at the 2010 Spike Video Game Awards, in 2012, she was nominated again for Mass Effect 3.

In February 2023, Hale guest voiced Riyo Chuchi, a Pantoran member of the Imperial Senate, in Star Wars: The Bad Batch.

In 2021, Hale branched out from voice acting by founding two new businesses, Skills Hub and The Haven. Skills Hub is a coaching program for aspiring voice actors. Featuring 89 coaches including experienced voice actors and casting directors, Skills Hub teaches prospective voice actors skills on how to enter and navigate the VO/VA industry.

The Haven was a self help group led by Hale, run through Patreon. It featured monthly zoom calls and advice from Hale herself. The group was indefinitely paused as of June 2024 due to other commitments making scheduling difficult.

== Influences and reception ==
In an interview with The Geek Forge regarding her influences, Hale cited voice actors such as Dee Bradley Baker, Grey DeLisle, Phil LaMarr, Tress MacNeille, Kath Soucie, Frank Welker, and April Winchell, with emphasis on LaMarr. She also admires the work of actors Judi Dench, Edward James Olmos, and Mary McDonnell.

Hale's peers and critics have noted her versatility in her roles: Michael Abbott, a professor at Wabash College who blogs about video games, said that she has made herself "untraceable" despite having voiced dozens of roles. Journalist Tom Bissell noted that she has been referred as "a kind of Meryl Streep of the form". In an interview, she said, "I love the anonymity. I could walk through Comic Con, and no matter how many people who might be a fan of what I do, we're in proximity and no one knew. I'm invisible. If I'd have done as many on-camera roles as I've done voiceover, I couldn't go to the grocery store in peace." She stated in the same interview, "As cheesy as it sounds, the player is the star of the game. That's the beauty of games—that it's you that inhabits it. It's not about someone else, it's about that you get to be that person, and if I do my job right, I as a person disappear. Your experience is primary."

== Personal life ==
Hale lived in the Los Angeles area, but since 2020, she has relocated back to Canada and now resides on Vancouver Island where she continues to do voice recordings from her personal home studio. She has a son. She has several pets and enjoys the outdoors, stating that she might have become an architect because she likes to redo houses. She has said that she was not allowed to watch cartoons as a child, and had not played any video games until her 2011 interview with Tom Bissell for The New Yorker, in which she played Mass Effect for the first time. She likes horses and has mentioned being part of the local evacuation response team that rescues horses from advancing wildfires.
