= The Amazing Spiez! =

French/Canadian animated television series

- From left to right: Marc, Lee, Megan and Tony.
- French: SpieZ! Nouvelle Génération
- Genre: Spy fiction; Action
- Created by: Vincent Chalvon-Demersay; David Michel
- Written by: Vincent Chalvon-Demersay; Michelle Lamoreaux; Robert Lamoreaux; Ben Joseph; Frank Young; David Michel
- Directed by: Stephane Berry(director and art); Rodolphe Ploquin; Patrick Lavoie(art director)
- Voices of: List: French; Donald Reignoux; Alexandre N'Guyen; Caroline Mozzone; Céline Ronté; Jean-Claude Donda; Delphine Braillon; Emmanuel Garijo; Alexandra Garijo; English; Andrew Sabiston; Alyson Court; Julie Lemieux; Peter Cugno; Adrian Truss; Liz Ramos; Dan Petronijevic; Sugar Lyn Beard
- Composers: Paul-Étienne Côté; Maxime Barzel(season 2)
- Countries of origin: France; Canada
- Original languages: French; English
- No. of seasons: 2
- No. of episodes: 52 (list of episodes)

Production
- Executive producers: Lorraine Collet; Vincent Chalvon-Demersay; Sylvain Viau; Berthe Lotsova(season 2)
- Producers: Vincent Chalvon-Demersay; David Michel; Sylvain Viau
- Production locations: Paris, France; Miami, Florida
- Editors: Rodolphe Ploquin; Sébastien Malo
- Running time: 22 minutes
- Production companies: Marathon Media; Image Entertainment Corporation

Original release
- Network: TF1/Canal J (France); Teletoon (Canadian English); Télétoon (Canadian French)
- Release: March 15, 2009 – May 25, 2012

Related
- Totally Spies!

The Amazing Spiez! (French: SpieZ! Nouvelle Génération) is an animated spy comedy television series created by Vincent Chalvon-Demersay and David Michel. A spin-off of Totally Spies!, it was co-produced by Marathon Media, Image Entertainment Corporation and Canal J, in association with TF1 and Teletoon Canada. Where its predecessor followed three teenage girls, The Amazing Spiez! follows four young siblings, Lee, Marc, Megan and Tony Clark, who are recruited by the World Organization Of Human Protection (WOOHP) and must balance family and school life with international spy missions. The series premiered in 2009 and ran for two seasons and 52 episodes, ending on 25 May 2012.

The series follows four siblings Lee, Marc, Megan and Tony Clark who have been chosen by the W.O.O.H.P (World Organization Of Human Protection) to become international spies. Together, the spies learn to juggle everyday life with their missions.

== Development and production ==
Marathon Media, the company behind Totally Spies! developed The Amazing Spiez! as a way to expand the Totally Spies! brand to a different younger age group. David Michel, then Marathon's general manager said the company wanted to take the brand to a "completely different cartoony level". While Totally Spies! used a feminine colour scheme and drew on manga, the new series was heavily influenced by American comic books, with its designers using the look of Marvel Comics and DC Comics as a starting point. Produced in high definition as 52 episodes of 26 minutes, it was directed by Totally Spies! veteran Stephane Berry. Marathon planned to present the series at the MIPCOM market and said at the time that it was spending heavily on an online presence for it alongside TF1.

== Characters ==
- Lee Clark (voiced by Donald Reignoux in the French dub and by Andrew Sabiston in the English dub) is the oldest at age 13 (later 14) and considered the strongest one. He is very athletic and the most powerful spy in the group. While his two brothers share funny and immature traits, Lee is one part big brother and one part father figure, and in his eyes, nothing is more important than his siblings. His spy suit and his MPCom are red. He is also the jet pilot and is often shown to be claustrophobic. In addition, he has a habit of going crazy over girls, which is similar to Clover's boy-craziness. In his normal appearance, Lee has auburn colored hair in the style of a flat top, pale blue eyes, and light skin. He wears a red short sleeved shirt with a white "W" on it, burgundy pants, red and white shoes, and a red and white wrist band.
- Marc Clark (voiced by Alexandre N'Guyen in the French dub and by Peter Cugno in the English dub) is the smartest one in the group at age 12 (later 13). Much like Sam, his intelligence is sometimes considered freaky by his siblings, as shown in Operation WOOCSI. He calls himself the 'Family Geek'. He has the knowledge of every single subject known to man, but 'like most geeks' cannot get a date. His spy suit and his MPCom are blue. Sometimes he switches places with Lee or Megan as the jet pilot. In his normal appearance, Marc has ginger hair, brown eyes and light skin. He wears a short sleeved blue two-toned hoodie with a white long sleeved shirt under it, dark green cargo pants, and blue and white shoes. He and Lee are the only two siblings that look like their mom - with the hair and skin tone.
- Megan Clark (voiced by Caroline Mozzone in the French dub and by Alyson Court in the English dub) is an optimistic and high energy 12-year-old girl (later 13) who is Marc's fraternal twin sister. She always hangs out with her brothers and usually cracks up at jokes that are not funny at all. She is big on saving the environment and is trying to find ways to reduce her family's carbon footprint. She is often reminded by her brothers that she is 'just a girl', but this pushes her to be even more competitive. Her spy suit and MPCom are pink. She sometimes switches places with Lee as the jet pilot. Megan is almost the spitting image of Alex from the original series, 'Totally Spies!'. In her normal appearance, Megan has black hair swept up in the back (almost like Alex's), green eyes and dark skin. She wears a short-sleeved pink zip-up hoodie with purple sleeves that reveals her midriff, a pink skirt with white leggings, and pink and white shoes with fuchsia pink pom-poms on them. Her dark skin is probably from her aunt Trudy who is seen with a dark complexion and hair color from her father.
- Tony Clark (voiced by Céline Ronté in the French dub and by Julie Lemieux in the English dub) is the youngest sibling of the Clark family who is 11 (later 12) years old. He is a no-nonsense go-getter and hyperactive boy. He is impatient and prefers to act before even thinking, which sometimes leads the spies into deep trouble. His spy suit and MPCom are yellow and the Freezdiscs seem to be his favorite gadget. He shares a room with Marc. In his normal appearance, Tony, like Megan, has black hair that is swept up one way and down the other and also has green eyes and dark skin. He wears a long sleeved yellow shirt under a blue jacket, blue pants, yellow and white shoes, and a grey belt. He and Megan are the only ones to look like Alex from Totally Spies! and to look like their dad - skin tone and hair style.
- Jerry Lewis (voiced by Jean-Claude Donda in the French dub and by Adrian Truss in the English dub) is the founder and administrator of WOOHP (World Organization of Human Protection). He is a middle-aged, and very serious British gentleman. He briefs the Spiez on their missions, distributes their gadgets, and provides mission support with information or direct involvement. He is often the butt of jokes when it comes to his absence of a full head of hair and his age.
- Tami (voiced by Delphine Braillon in the French dub and by Sugar Lyn Beard in the English dub) is a popular 13-year-old (later 14) girl in the Spiez' school. She's a rival to the Spiez. They, particularly Megan, find her annoying and greatly dislike her for being spoiled and snobby all the time. She is somewhat like Mandy from Totally Spies! although not as malicious. In "Operation: Scary Jerry Part 2," an anesmatic Jerry mistakes her for his daughter and she ends up assisting him, Terry, and Sherry in their plot. Luckily, her memory was erased at the end of the episode. She is the only character that wears more than one outfit in the whole show, aside from Megan in some episodes.
- Cal Clark (voiced by Emmanuel Garijo in the French dub and by Dan Petronijevic in the English dub) is the husband of Karen and the father of the Spiez. He is a former OOPSIE agent who beat Alpha and Omega (episode 22-24) with his partner and now wife, Karen. He has no idea his children are WOOHP agents. He owns a sports store and has a very healthy way of life. As the head of the Clark family, Cal wishes to instill his kids to follow a certain kind of discipline.
- Karen Clark (voiced by Alexandra Garijo in the French dub and by Liz Ramos in the English dub) is the wife of Cal, the younger sister of Aunt Trudy, and the mother of the Spiez. Karen is a former OOPSIE agent who, like her husband, has no idea her children are WOOHP agents.
- Trudy Vanderhoug was the aunt of the spiez, Karen’s sister and Cal’s sister-in-law. She is extremely nosey and, as stated by her niece and nephews, a true busy-body. Her last name was revealed in “Operation: Nano Spiez.”
- Sam, Clover, Alex, Britney (the four girls), Blaine, and Dean appear on occasion.
- Some of the villains from Totally Spies! particularly from the fifth season, have appeared.

== Continuity ==
This series is set between the events of the Totally Spies! series seasons 6 and 7, with the appearances of Jerry and the original spies have returned for more missions, despite Jerry's retirement from WHOOP at the end of the fifth season.

== Episodes ==
| Series | Episodes | Originally released | |
| Series | Episodes | First released | Last released |
|---|---|---|---|
| 1 | 26 | 15 March 2009 | 26 February 2010 |
| 2 | 26 | 5 July 2010 | 25 May 2012 |

== Broadcast ==
In March 2010, Cartoon Network in the United States acquired The Amazing Spiez! along with all five seasons of Totally Spies! and its feature film, in a deal for Marathon's catalogue handled globally by Zodiak Entertainment; Kidscreen described the new series as a boy-oriented spy action spin-off. In Canada, the English-language version premiered on Teletoon on Monday, 6 September 2010, at 4:30 p.m. ET/PT. It was also aired on MBC 3 in the Arab World and Discovery Kids in India. As of April 16, 2022, the series started to become available on the official Totally Spies! YouTube channel, with new episodes being uploaded on Saturdays. The show also has its own YouTube channel, established in 2013, which mostly uploads highlights from various episodes.

== Reception ==
Emily Ashby of Common Sense Media gave the series a mixed review, rating the show 3 out of 5 stars and writing that "It's all about adventure, action, and fun, and most of the content is forgettable at best. In the end, it's a pretty safe choice for occasional viewing, but there are better options -- with better messages -- out there for kids."
