= Claire Guyot =

French actress and singer (born 1966)

- Born: 28 June 1966 (age 59); Paris, France
- Occupations: Actress; singer
- Years active: 1988–present
- Spouse: Serge Faliu

Claire Guyot (born 28 June 1966) is a French actress and singer, known for her prolific dubbing of foreign productions. She is also artistic director of dubbing.

Guyot has recently started to appear in theater productions. In 2010 she portrayed Donna in the musical Mamma Mia! at the Théâtre Mogador.

== Filmography ==
=== Theatre ===
Year	Production	Role	Venue	Ref.
2010	Mamma Mia!	Donna	Théâtre Mogador	
