= Dog toy =

Toy that is specifically for dogs to play with

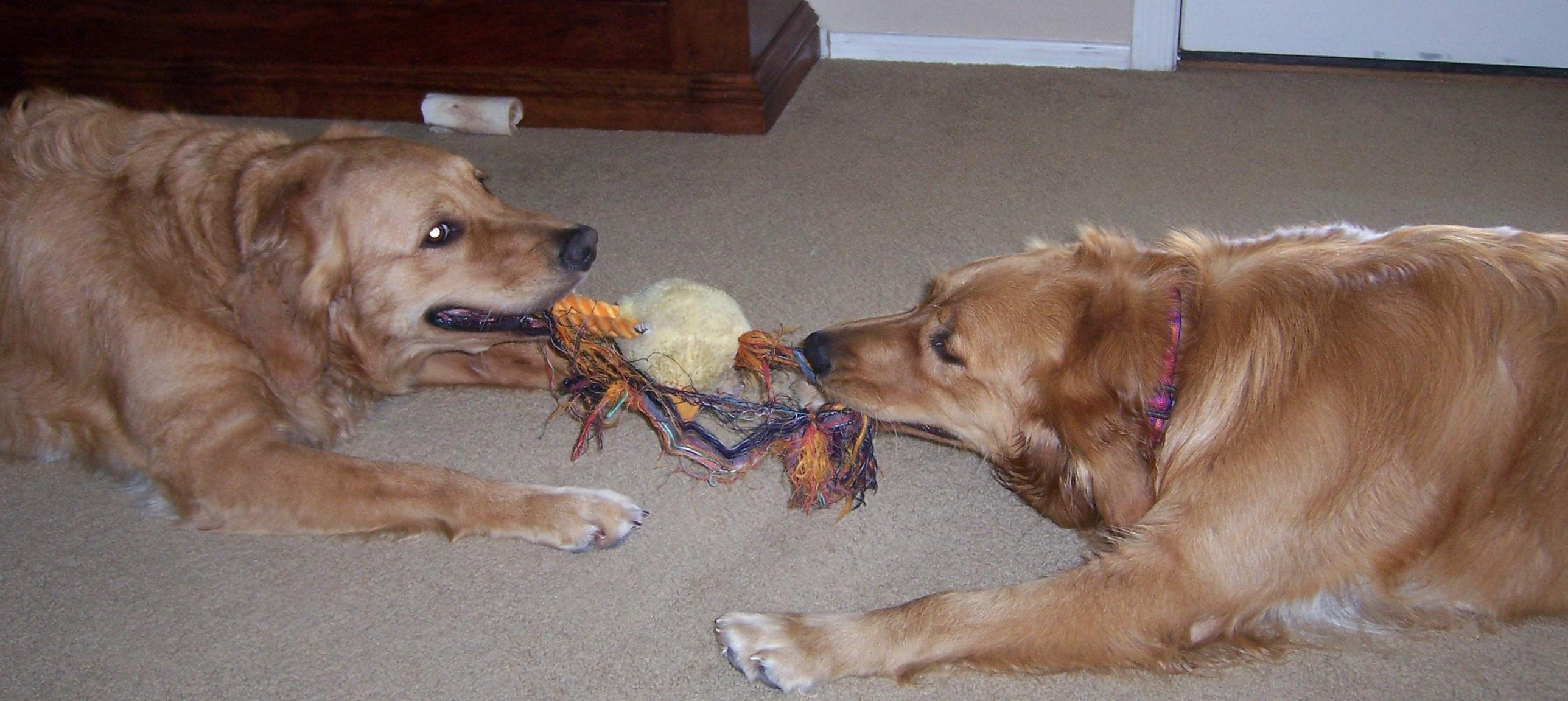
Golden Retrievers playing with a tug toy

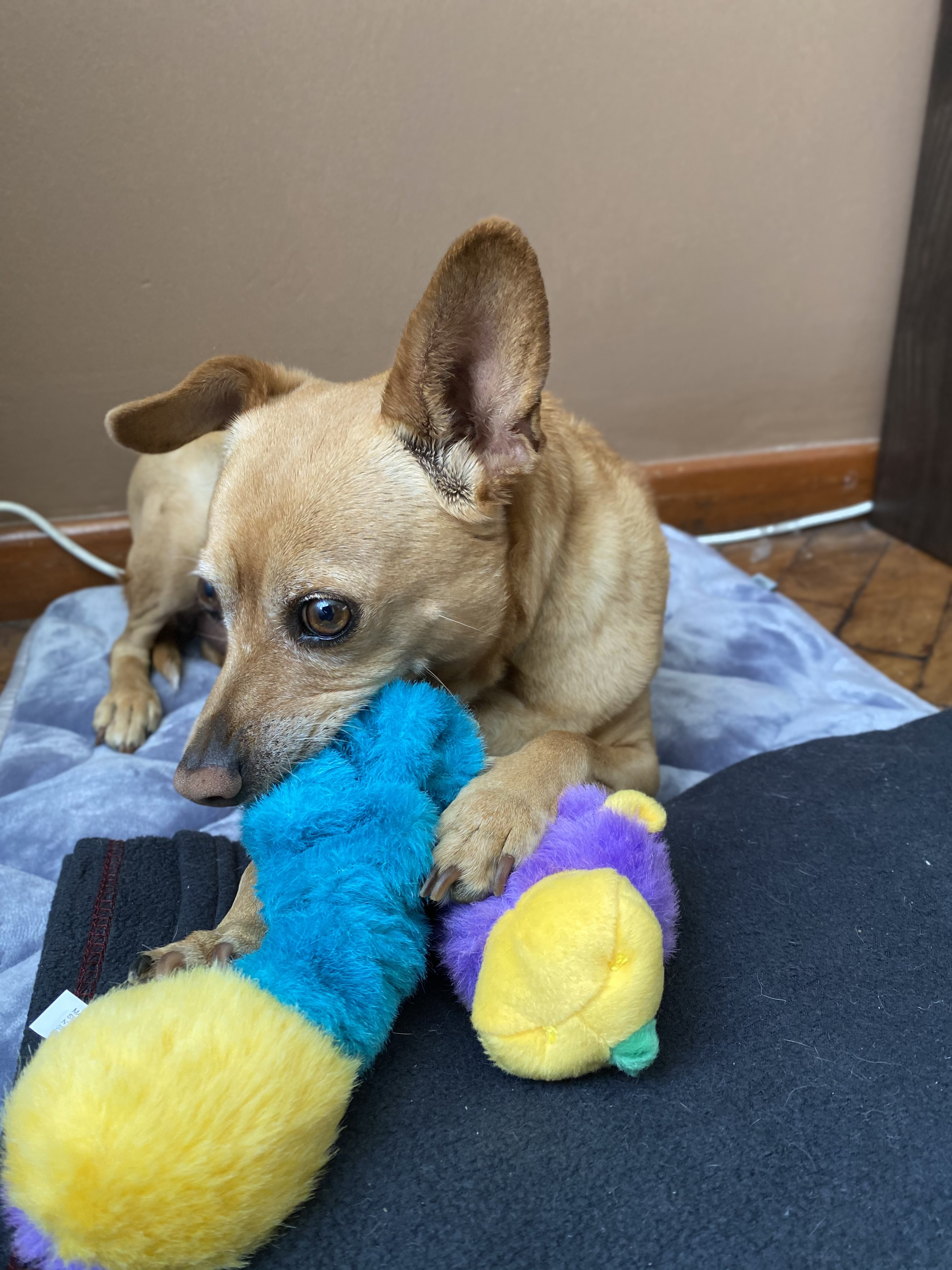
A Chihuahua-mix playing with a multi-textured toy.

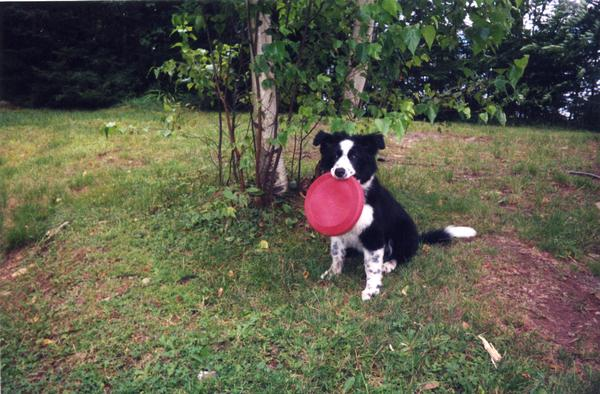
Border Collie pup with frisbee

Toys specifically marketed for dogs to play with come in many varieties, including dog bones, puppy toys, balls, tug toys, training aids, squeaky toys, discs and frisbees, plush toys, and sticks.

Dog toys serve different purposes. Puppies, for instance, need toys they can chew on when they are teething because their gums and jaws become very sore and chewing on things provides them relief. Playing with different toys also encourages exercise, which benefits the dogs' overall health, stimulates their minds, discourages problem behavior resulting from boredom and excess energy, and promotes dental health.

There is a wide variety of dog toys on the market that are designed for different purposes and depending on the dog's characteristics such as size, activity level, chewing habits, and play style.

== Edible chew toys (Chhurpi) ==
Chhurpi, a traditional rock-hard cheese from the Himalayan regions of Nepal, Bhutan, and India, is widely used as a natural, long-lasting edible dog chew. Made from the milk of Chauri (a yak-cow hybrid) or local cows, the cheese is boiled, smoke-dried, and fermented for several months until it reaches a stone-hard consistency.

In recent years, Nepal has become a global exporter of these chews. For instance, production in districts such as Ilam has scaled significantly to meet international demand from North America and Europe. These chews provide mechanical dental cleaning by reducing plaque and tartar through prolonged gnawing. A common safety recommendation is to microwave small leftover pieces, causing them to puff up into a crunchy, safer treat.

== Multifunctional ==
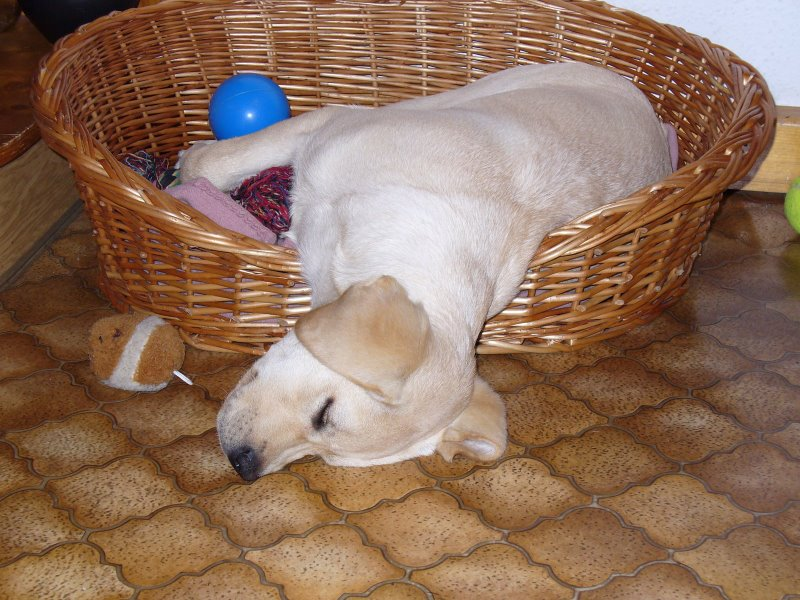
Labrador pup with plush squeaky toy, ball, and knotted rope that can be thrown, tugged or chewed

Some toys can serve multiple functions for dogs to interact with, combining common play behaviors into a single toy. Some can adapt to other toys and objects, and be combined by the dog owner to create new toys for dogs to play with. Whereas a hard ball is not well-suited for chewing, and a plush toy is difficult to throw, wrapping the ball in a plush exterior creates a toy that can be thrown and chewed on. Such toys may provide more entertainment value for dogs and their owners.

== Distraction toys ==
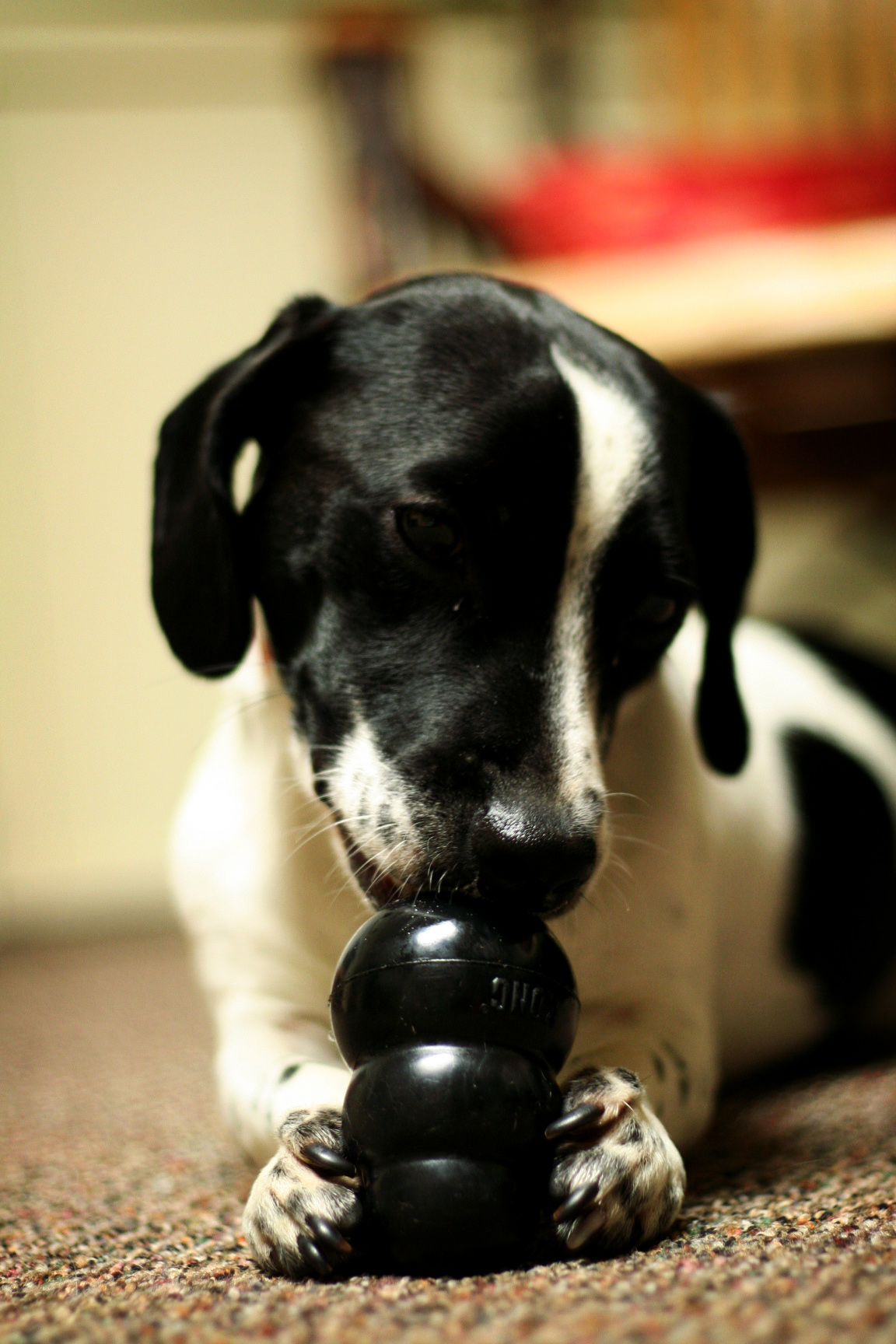
Kong dog toy can be thrown, stuffed with treats, or chewed

These toys can be useful for extremely active dogs who need mental stimulation as well as physical exercise. Some examples are food delivery toys, Kongs stuffed with dog food, frozen peanut butter and/or treats, chew challenge toys, and puzzle toys.

== Bones ==
The term "bones" can include animal bones as well as manufactured bones and dental bones. Animal bones offer a lot of chewing potential but the true nutritional benefits are derived from the soft tissues attached to the bone such as meat, cartilage, fat and connective tissue, not from the bones themselves. There are dangers associated with animal bones, including broken teeth and possible ingestion of large fragments of bone which can cause serious injury or death.

== Latex and rubber ==
Latex and rubber dog toys are great for dog entertainment. With these kind of toys, dogs that are aggressive chewers have a safe way to satisfy their biting instincts. These toys also help keep dogs' gums and teeth clean and healthy. In general, hard rubber bones and other latex dog toys help improve dogs' overall oral hygiene.

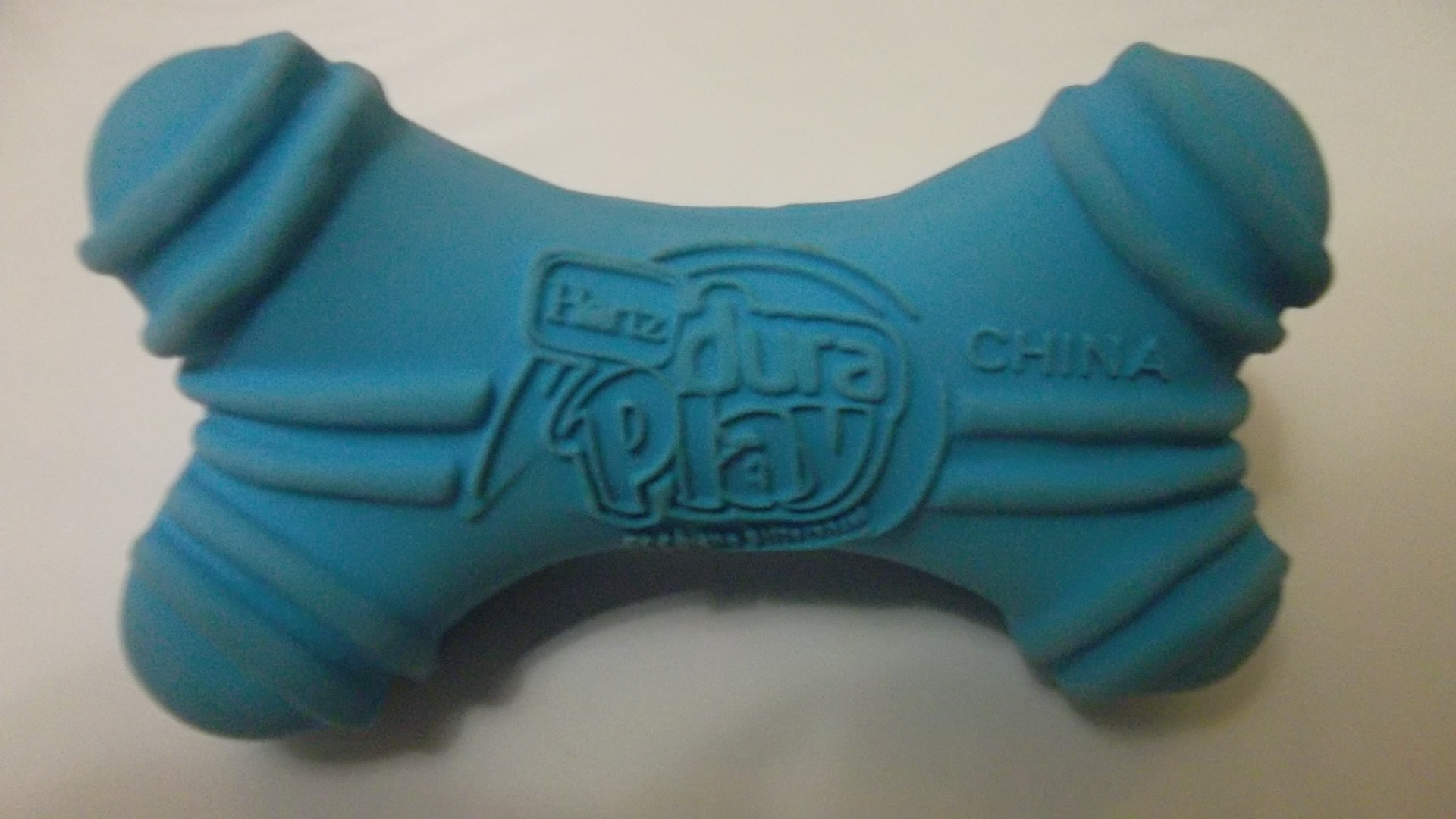
Blue bone-shaped toy manufactured in China

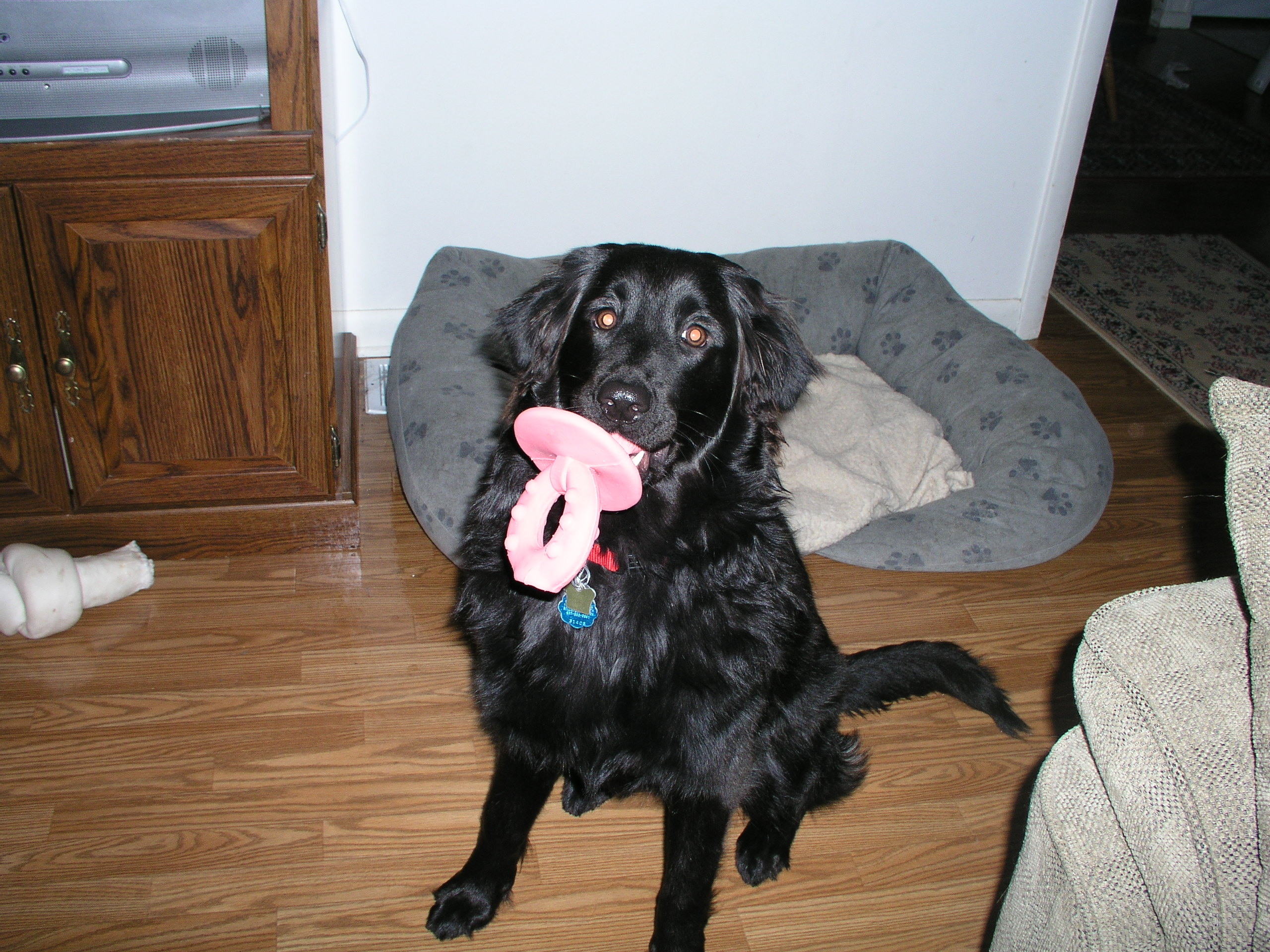
Labrador Retriever mix with rubber squeaky toy resembling a baby's pacifier

== Sticks ==
Dogs often enjoy gnawing on small tree branches and pinecones. Sticks can also be thrown for the dog to retrieve but this is not recommended due to potential health problems that can develop, including punctures in the mouth. Dog owners should consult their veterinarians if they have any doubts over whether a toy is safe.

== Balls ==
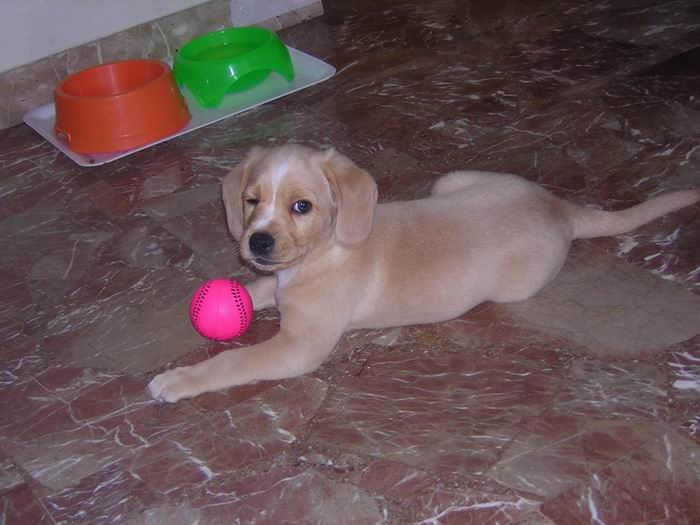
Pup with pink tennis ball

Balls of all shapes and sizes help keep dogs active and fit. They are a great way to play, and exercise a dog at the same time.

== Safety ==
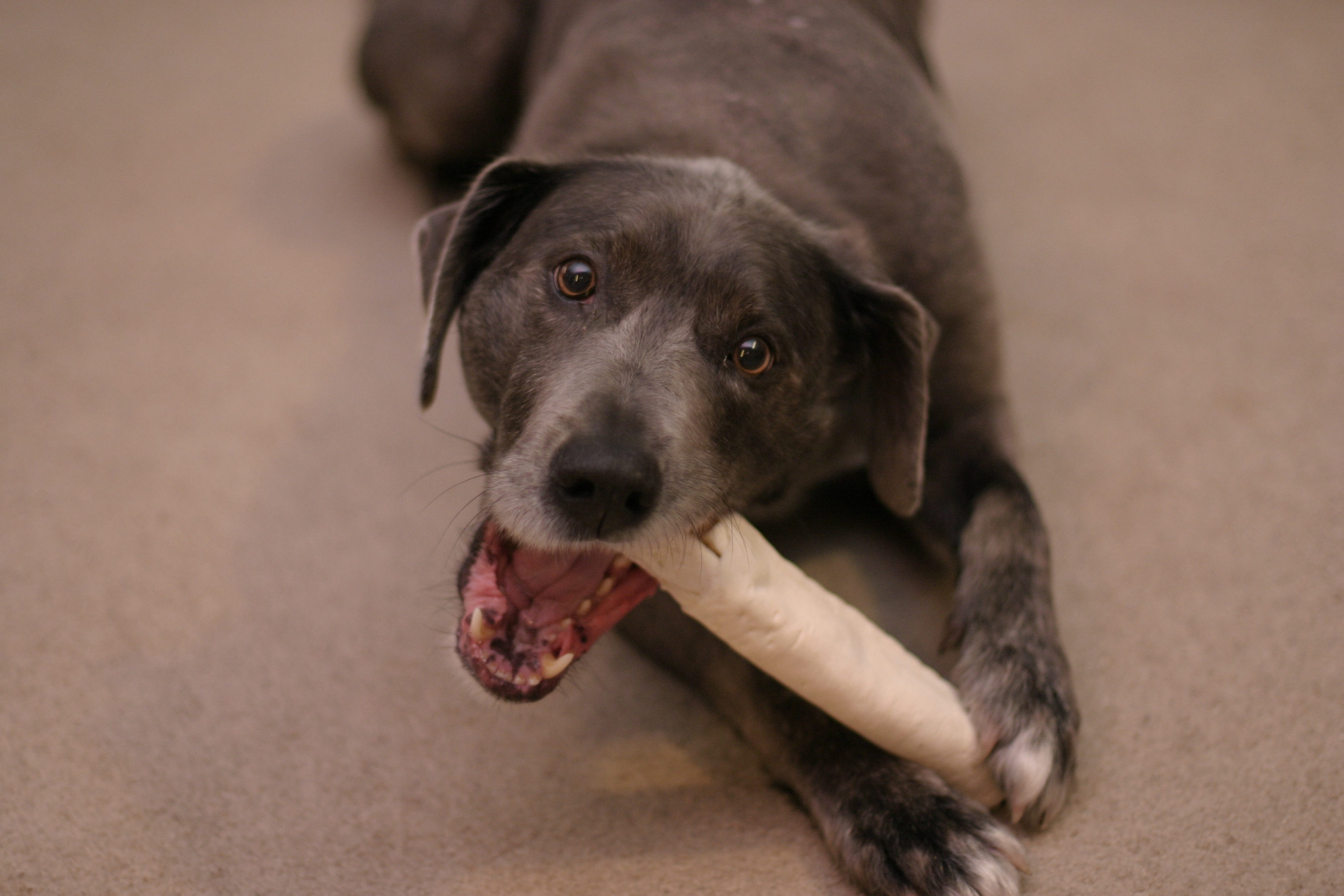
Dogs should always be supervised when chewing edible rawhide toys

Dog toys are not safe if small pieces can be chewed or pulled off as these could be swallowed by the dog. The toy should also be adequate for the dog, taking into consideration their size and activity levels.

When choosing a dog toy, it is important that pet owners choose those made with non-toxic materials. Dog owners should avoid giving their dogs objects with small parts that could be chewed off and ingested (such as cooked chicken bones).

== See also ==
- Cat play and toys
- Toy
