= Kong Company =

American manufacturer of dog- and cat-toys

KONG Company

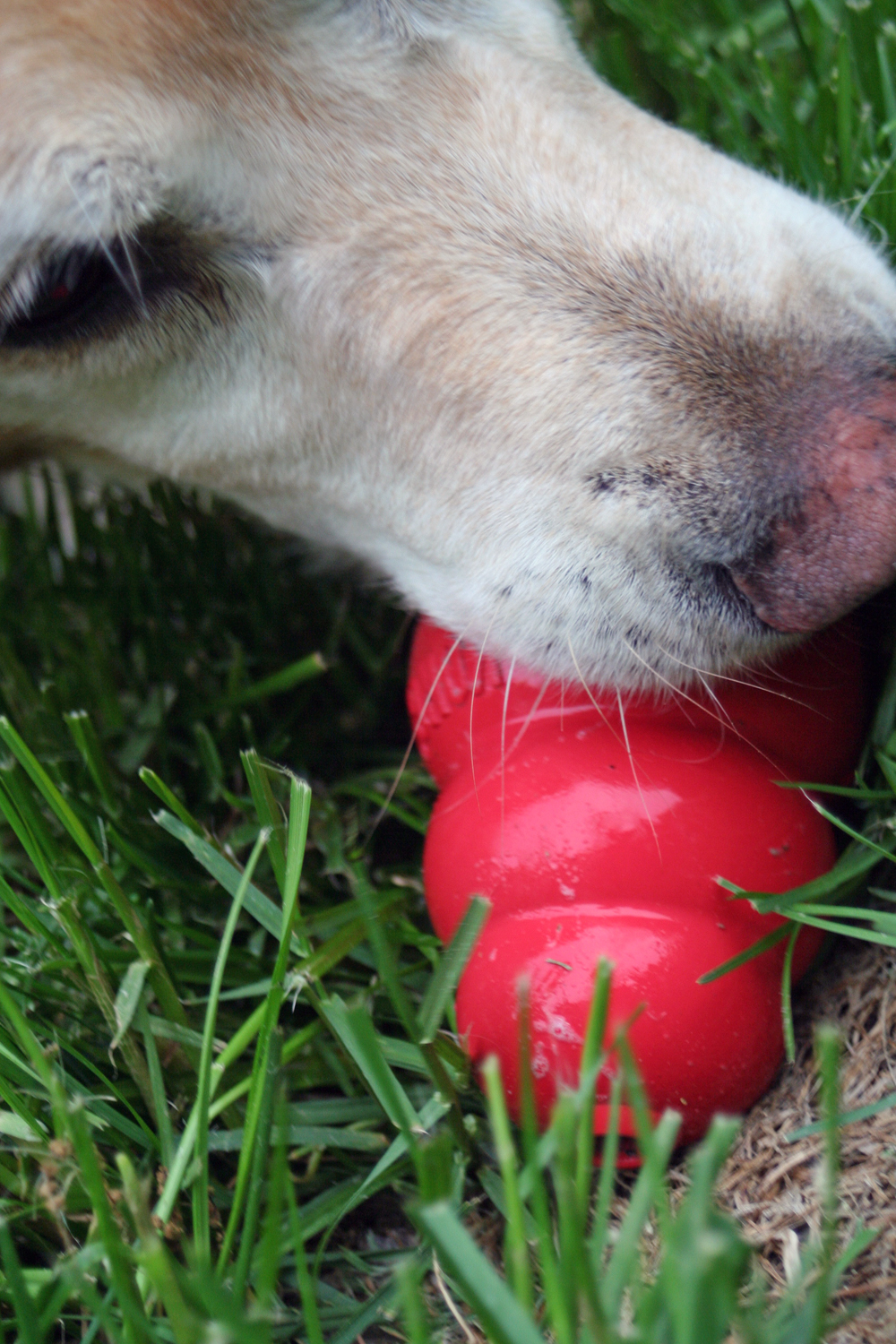
- Type: Limited liability company
- Industry: Pet products
- Founded: 1976; 50 years ago in Golden, Colorado, U.S.
- Founder: Joe Markham
- Website: kongcompany.com

The Kong Company (stylized as KONG) is an American company headquartered in Golden, Colorado that develops, designs, and produces lines of dog toys and cat toys. Its primary line of product is KONG, a snowman-like chew toy for dogs.

== History ==
Joe Markham, the company founder created the KONG product in the 1970s, when he noticed Fritz, his German Shepherd damaging his teeth by chewing rocks. He discovered that Fritz enjoyed chewing on a hard rubber Volkswagen van suspension device. He spent about six years experimenting with different compounds to produce a chew toy of similar size and shape which he could sell to pet owners. A friend commented that the toy looked like "an earplug for King Kong", hence its name. Originally, Markham sold most of his products to Israel, Japan, Australia, and the United Kingdom, but sales in the United States in the mid-1980s for KONG began rising and have remained popular. Planet Dog: A Doglopedia (2005), a book, says KONG is "possibly the best-known dog toy in the world".

== Products ==
The classic KONG toy resembles a snowman-like structure of three balls pushed together. They come in several variations for dogs of different ages and sizes. Made of rubber, they are hollow in the middle, and can be stuffed with treats or frozen to provide longer distraction for dogs. The classic KONG product is offered in different rubber types, tailored to dogs of different chewing capabilities, ages, and sizes.

KONG also offers a line of dental chews, balls, pull toys including the KONG Wubba and the KONG Tugger Knots, Frisbees, a dog binky, floating toys, squeakers, and various interactive toys and accessories. For cats, KONG has a line of toys with a cat version of "Wubba", other chew toys, scratching boards, and catnip.

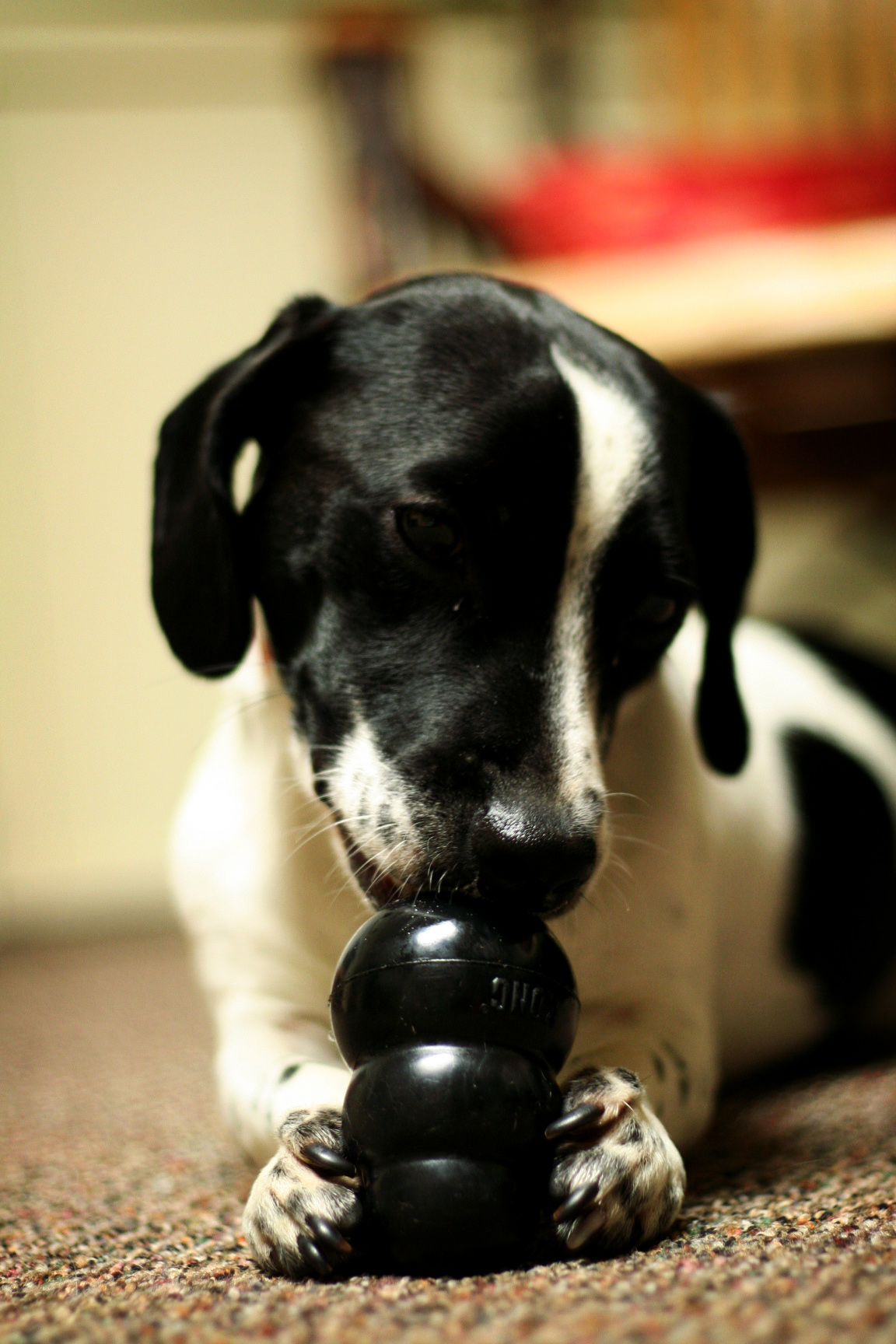
A dog eating food from a black KONG

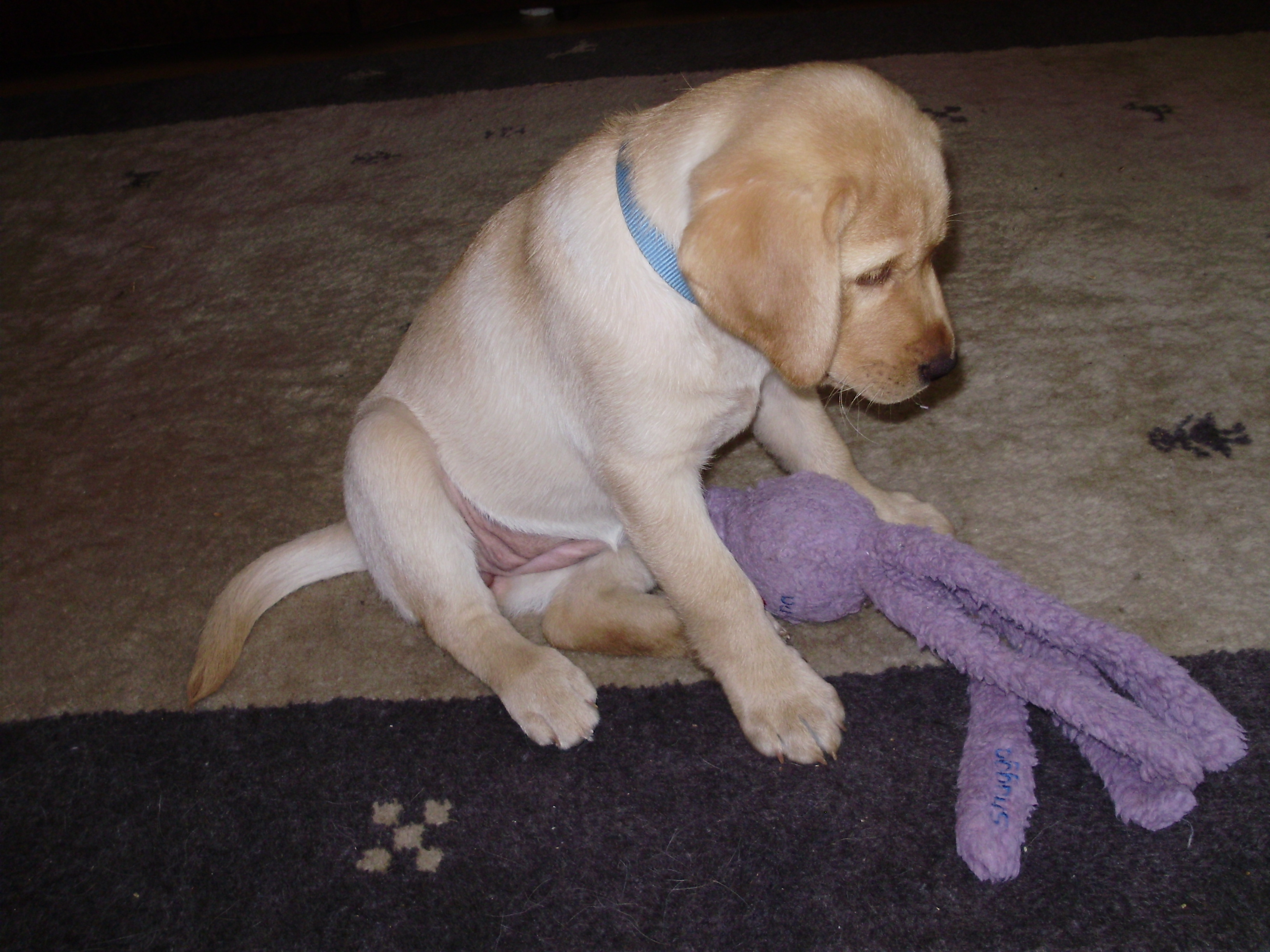
A puppy with a KONG Wubba
