= Chew toy =

Type of toy designed for animals to chew

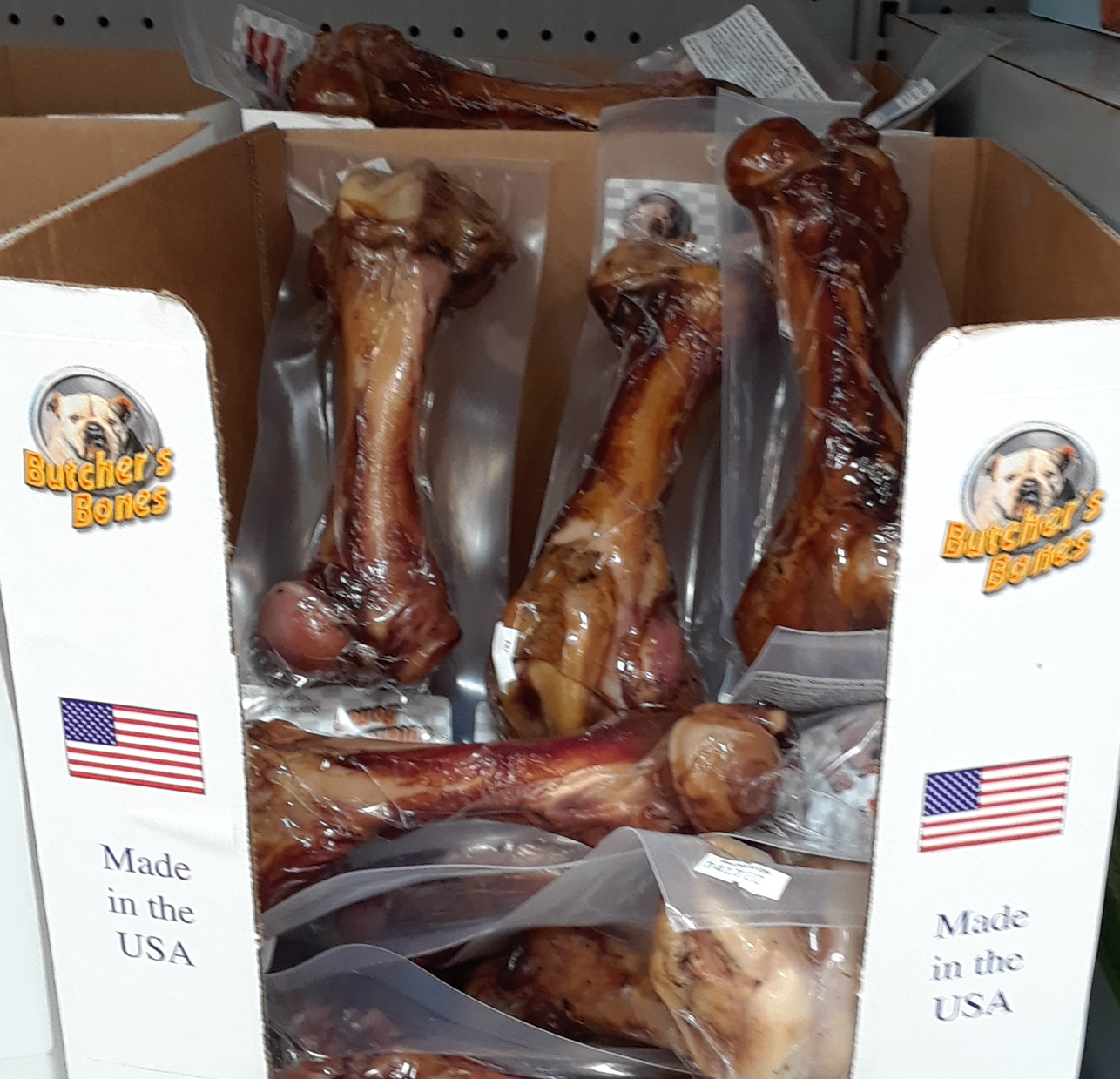
Dog chew toys made in the USA

A chew toy is an object designed to be chewed on by animals for stimulation and relief from boredom or discomfort. Chew toys can help relieve pain associated with teething, which is especially true for younger animals, such as puppies. There are several types of chew toys made from different materials, including rawhide, wood, paper, and mineral. Chew toys are commonly associated with dogs, but have also been effective with birds, rodents, and rabbits. Some parents give human infants a similar toy called a teether to help soothe inflamed gums during teething.

== Uses ==
=== Anxiety relief ===
Chew toys have been used to relieve anxiety in animals. Some laws surrounding pig production within the European Union include chew toys under the umbrella of "manipulation materials" that are required by law to be provided to pigs to facilitate necessary "proper investigation and manipulation activities".

=== Gum health ===
Chew toys are also used to maintain animals' gums. Some domestic animals, such as rabbits and hamsters, specifically require chew toys, in order to maintain their oral health, since their teeth grow continuously throughout their life and must be whittled down by extensive chewing in order to maintain them at a functional length.

== Types ==
=== Rawhide ===
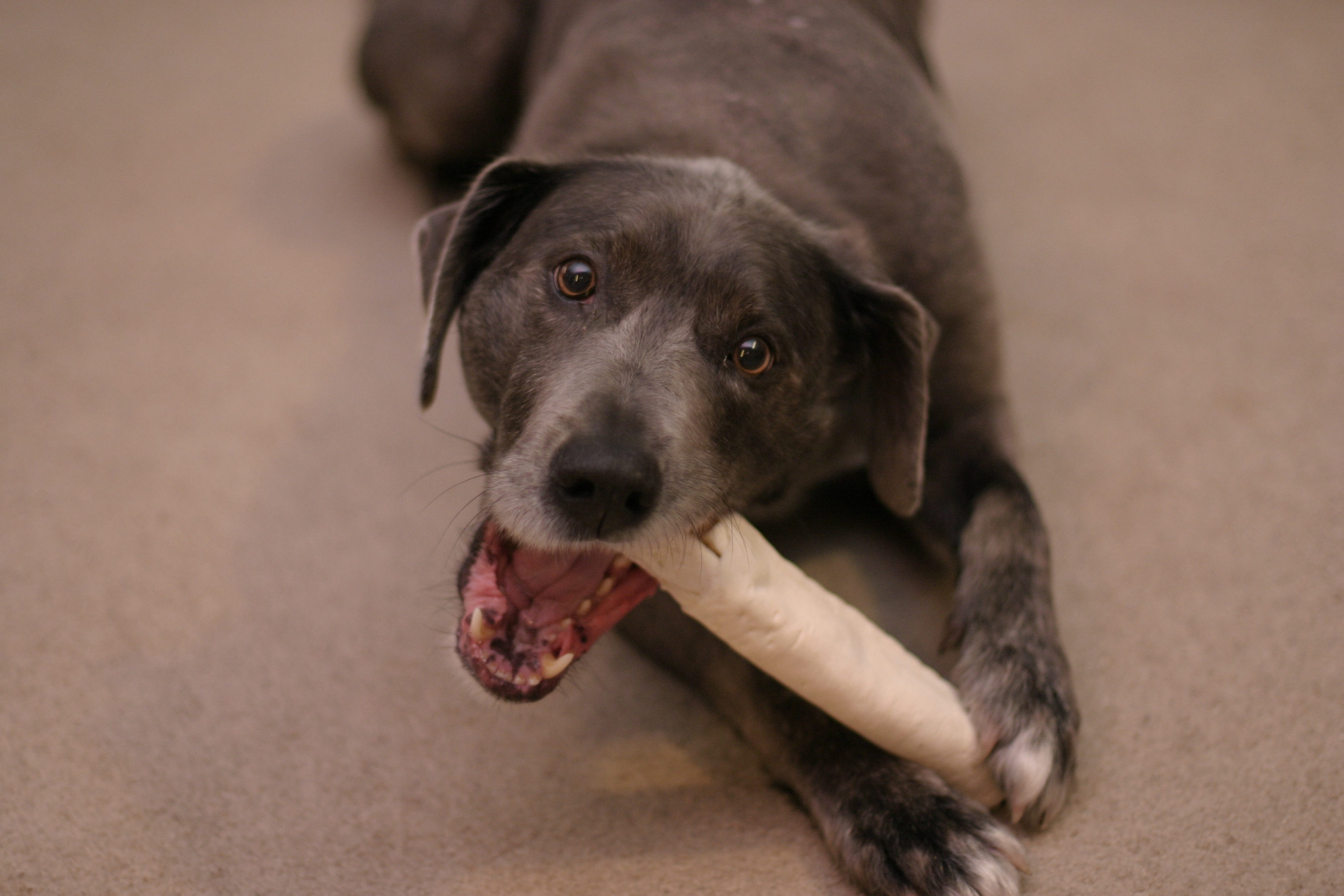
A dog with a rawhide chew toy

Rawhide chew toys are among the most popular chew toys for dogs. Since rawhides are made of hard and durable material, these toys can sometimes withstand weeks of wear. Examples of rawhide chew toys are twists and rawhide bones.

The general safety of rawhide dog chews has been contested. The American Kennel Club notes that the safety of rawhide chews depends on the dog; while smaller, softer-chewing dogs wear the rawhide down over time into safe, soft particles, larger dogs capable of breaking off and ingesting intact chunks of hard rawhide can experience intestinal blockages. Chew toys made of leather are not recommended for dogs as they cannot be properly digested in the stomach, and risk causing intestinal obstruction.

=== Wooden ===
Wooden chew toys are made of soft, non-poisonous wood, and are often coated in bright, vegetable-based dyes or paints. They are generally used by rabbits and small rodents.

=== Paper ===
Paper chew toys are made of non-bleached, non-toxic paper. They are often inexpensive or able to be crafted at home. One common type of paper chew toy is an empty toilet paper roll.

=== Mineral ===
Mineral chew toys are made of flavored animal-safe minerals. These range from flavored fruit-shaped blocks for birds to ice cream cone-shaped treats for rabbits. They also come shaped like bowls with minerals inside. A common mineral chew toy is the cuttlebone, a toy for birds that aids in trimming their nails and beaks.

=== Rubber ===
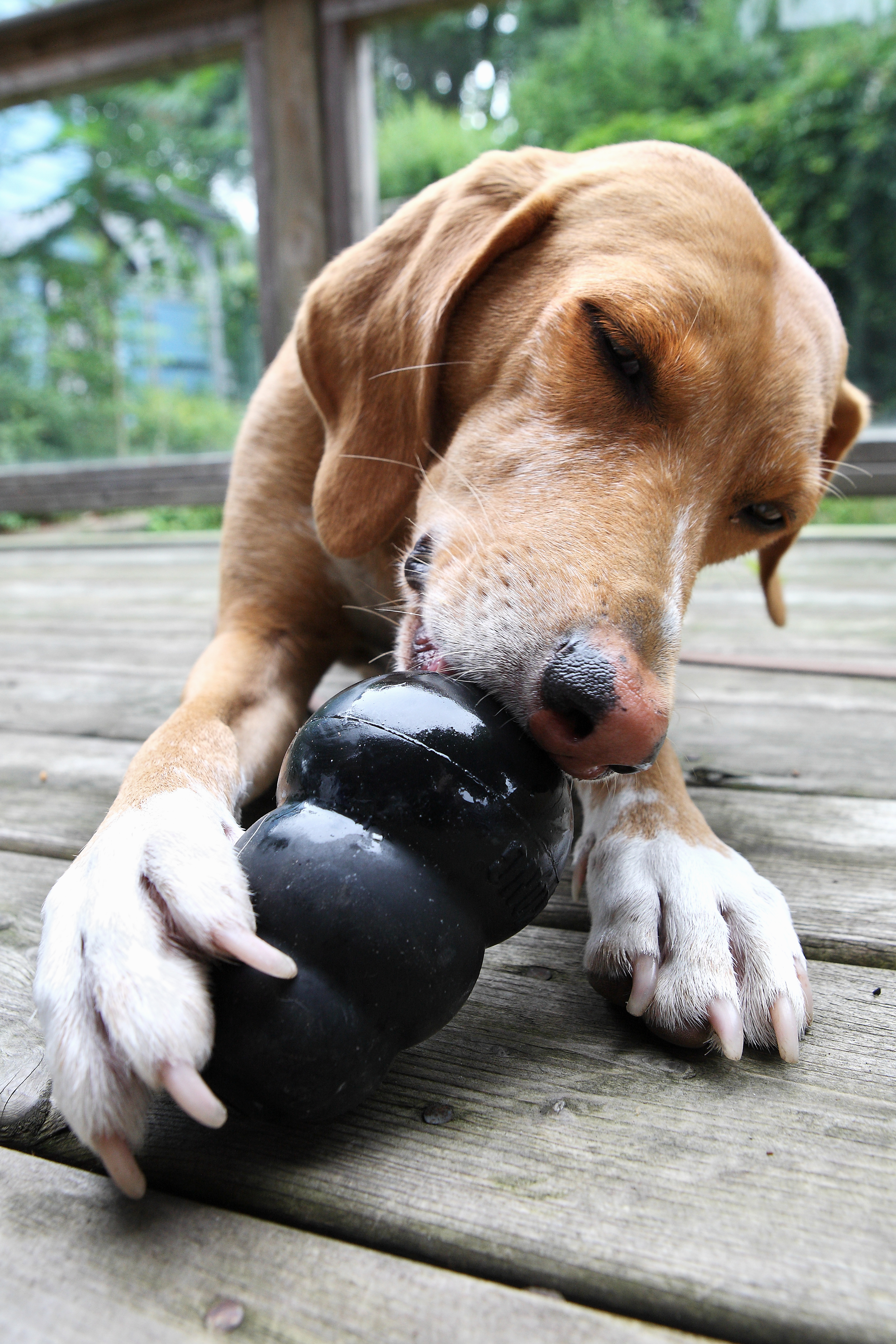
A dog eating treats out of a Kong, a rubber chew toy made by the Kong Company

There also exists a variety of rubber chew toys for dogs. Some are hollowed, so that one can place treats inside them. These chew toys sometimes contain materials that are unsafe for dogs to ingest, such as polyvinyl chloride.
