= Cat exercise wheel =

Large wheel

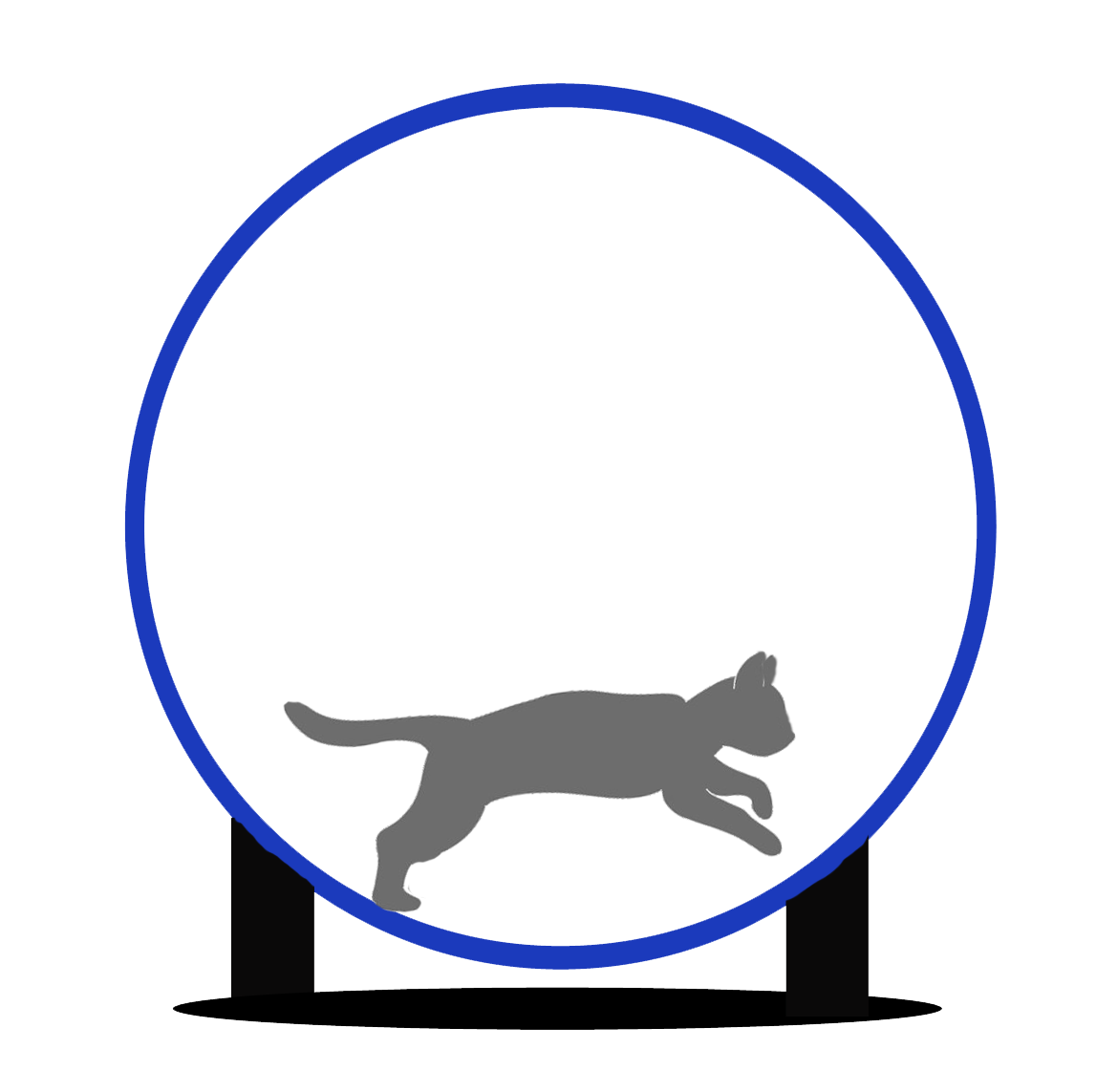
A diagram of a cat running on an exercise wheel

A cat exercise wheel is a rotating wheel on which felines can run or walk.

The design generally has many similarities to the more commonly known hamster wheels designed for household rodents. The rotating mechanism works similarly to aforementioned equipment, with the wheel turning when the cat shifts its weight onto part of the wheel upon entry. Cat exercise wheels can be used for enrichment, play or exercise as part of maintaining feline health.

== Indoor cats ==
Cats kept in homes or small apartments may not have opportunities to run outdoors or otherwise exercise a considerable amount. A cat wheel can assist cats in maintaining a healthy weight and body condition, as well as providing mental stimulation and a form of play.

== See also ==
- Cat toys
- Behavioral enrichment
- Treadwheel
