= Puppy teething =

Process where puppy teeth start erupting

Puppies first start with sucking from the time of being a newborn up to the time they start teething. Puppies around the age of two weeks old start to experience teething. Teething is the process by which a puppy's deciduous teeth come in and then fall out to make way for their permanent teeth. By 5–6 weeks of life, all of the deciduous teeth have come in, puppies will grow in a set of 28 deciduous teeth or needle teeth. Permanent teeth will start coming in around 12–16 weeks, and puppies will eventually end up with 42 permanent teeth. The process of teething is painful to puppies much like babies. During this process puppies will experience increased salivation, loss of appetite, and extreme irritability when the teeth do erupt from the gums. The gums will swell and become tender to palpation just prior to the tooth coming in. Puppies may exhibit excessive chewing, nipping, and drooling. If there is an extreme change in behavior, it is recommended to visit the veterinarian as soon as possible for an exam. Owners that would like to do an oral exam on their own must be prepared for potential aggressive behavior.

Some ways that dog owners can help their puppies during this painful teething stage is to ensure that your puppy has something to chew on that is soothing for them. Large carrots are recommended for puppies to teethe on and also are nutritious. Oftentimes pet owners will freeze teething toys to soothe their dogs irritated gums. Veterinarians do recommend chew toys help relieve teething pain. It is important that puppies get durable toys so that they can not accidentally swallow plastic or large pieces of fabric since puppy teeth are very sharp and durable. As your puppy's adult teeth start to grow in it is important to start maintaining the dog's dental health. It is recommended to brush your puppy's teeth every day and work with a veterinarian to schedule yearly dental exams and cleanings. If teething turns into aggressive biting, it is not advised to remove healthy canine teeth due to the fact that this does not address the actual problem at hand. Additionally, this could cause oral pathologic conditions that can be expensive to treat and require anesthesia.

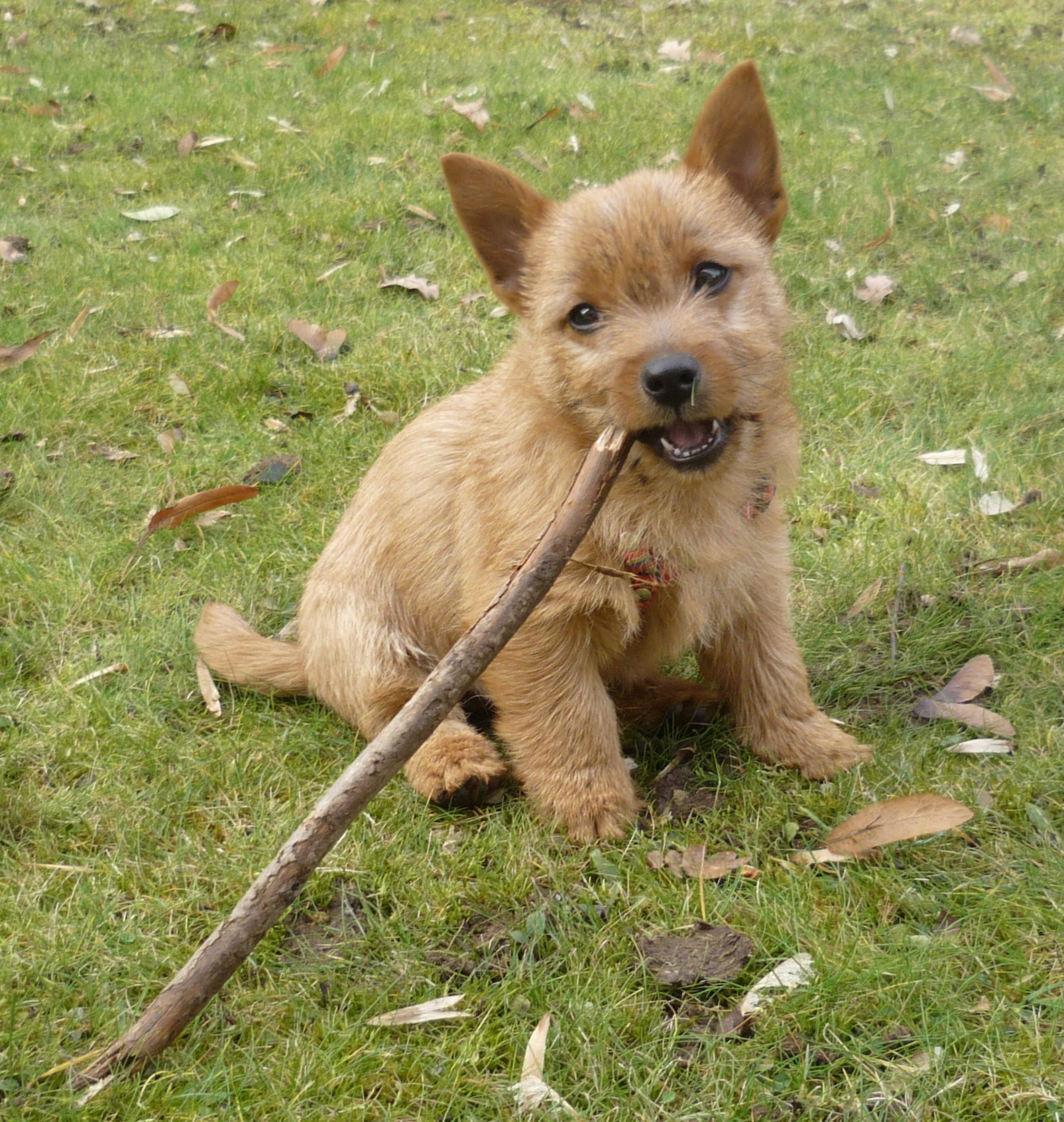
Teething Puppy

== See also ==
- Tooth eruption
