= Rawhide (material) =

Untanned hide or animal skin

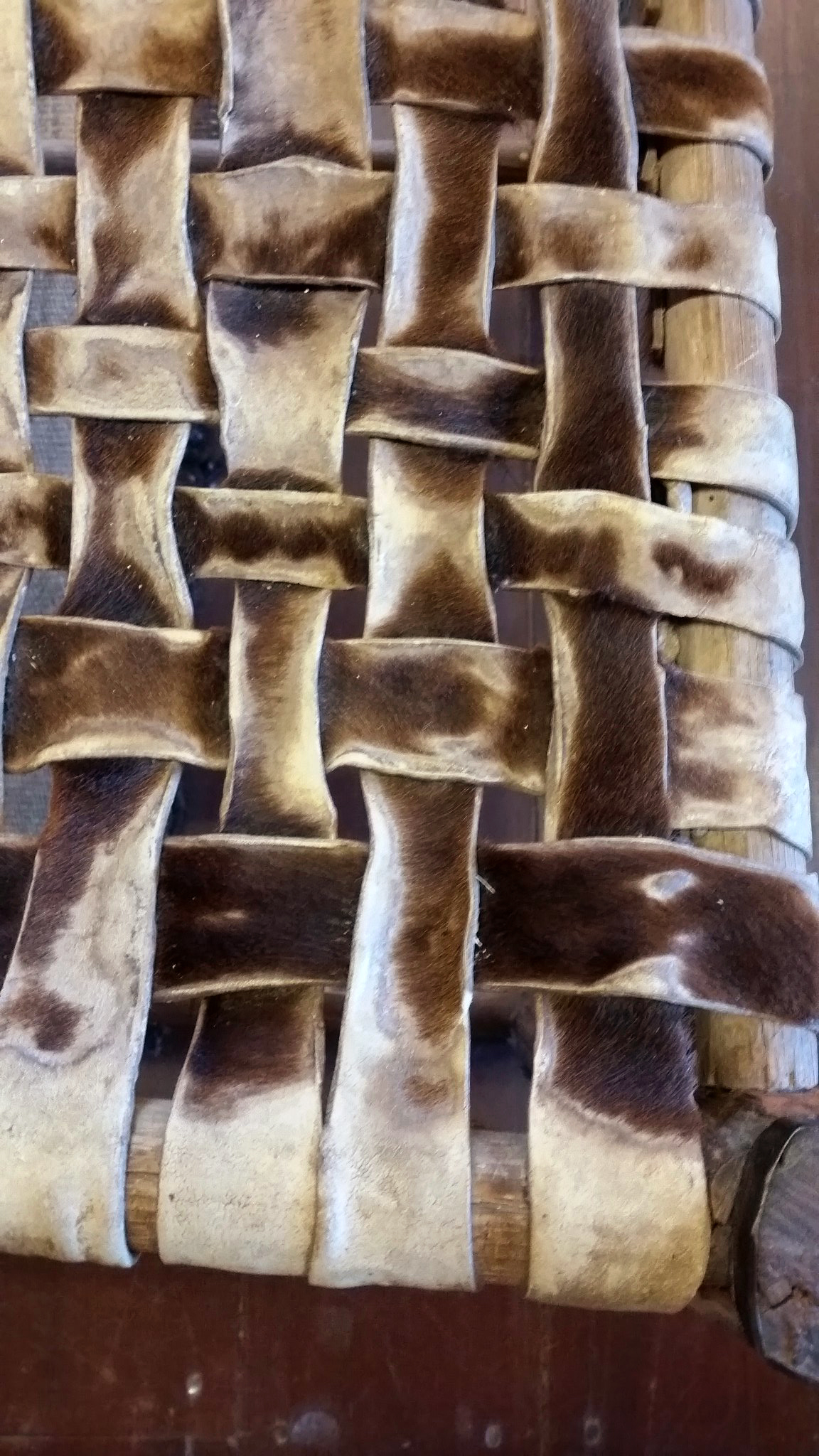
Detail of a chair with woven rawhide seat in the Jacob Hamblin House

Rawhide is a hide or animal skin that has not been exposed to tanning. It is similar to parchment, much lighter in color than leather made by traditional vegetable tanning.

Rawhide is more susceptible to water than leather, and it quickly softens and stretches if left wet unless well waterproofed.

"Rawhide" laces often sold for boots or baseball gloves are made of normal tanned leather rather than actual rawhide. Rawhide is not pliable when dry and would be unsuitable for that use.

== Process ==
The skin from buffalo, deer, elk or cattle from which most rawhide originates is prepared by removing all fur, meat and fat. The hide is then usually stretched over a frame before being dried. The resulting material is hard and translucent. It can be shaped by rewetting and forming before being allowed to thoroughly re-dry. It can be rendered more pliable by 'working', i.e. bending repeatedly in multiple directions, often by rubbing it over a post, sometimes traditionally by chewing. It may also be oiled or greased for a degree of waterproofing.

== Uses ==
It is often used for objects such as whips, drumheads or lampshades, and more recently (in the 1950s) chew toys for dogs. It is thought to be more durable than leather, especially in items suffering abrasion during use, and its hardness and its shapeability render it more suitable than leather for some items.

=== Saddles ===
Rawhide is often used to cover saddle trees, which make up the foundation of a western saddle, while wet: it strengthens the wooden tree by drawing up very tight as it dries and resists the abrasion regularly encountered during stock work or rodeo sports.

=== Bows ===
Rawhide can be used as a backing on a wooden bow. Such a backing keeps the bow from breaking by protecting the back from damage and preventing splinters from forming. Bows made from softer woods such as birch benefit more from a rawhide backing.

=== Hammers ===
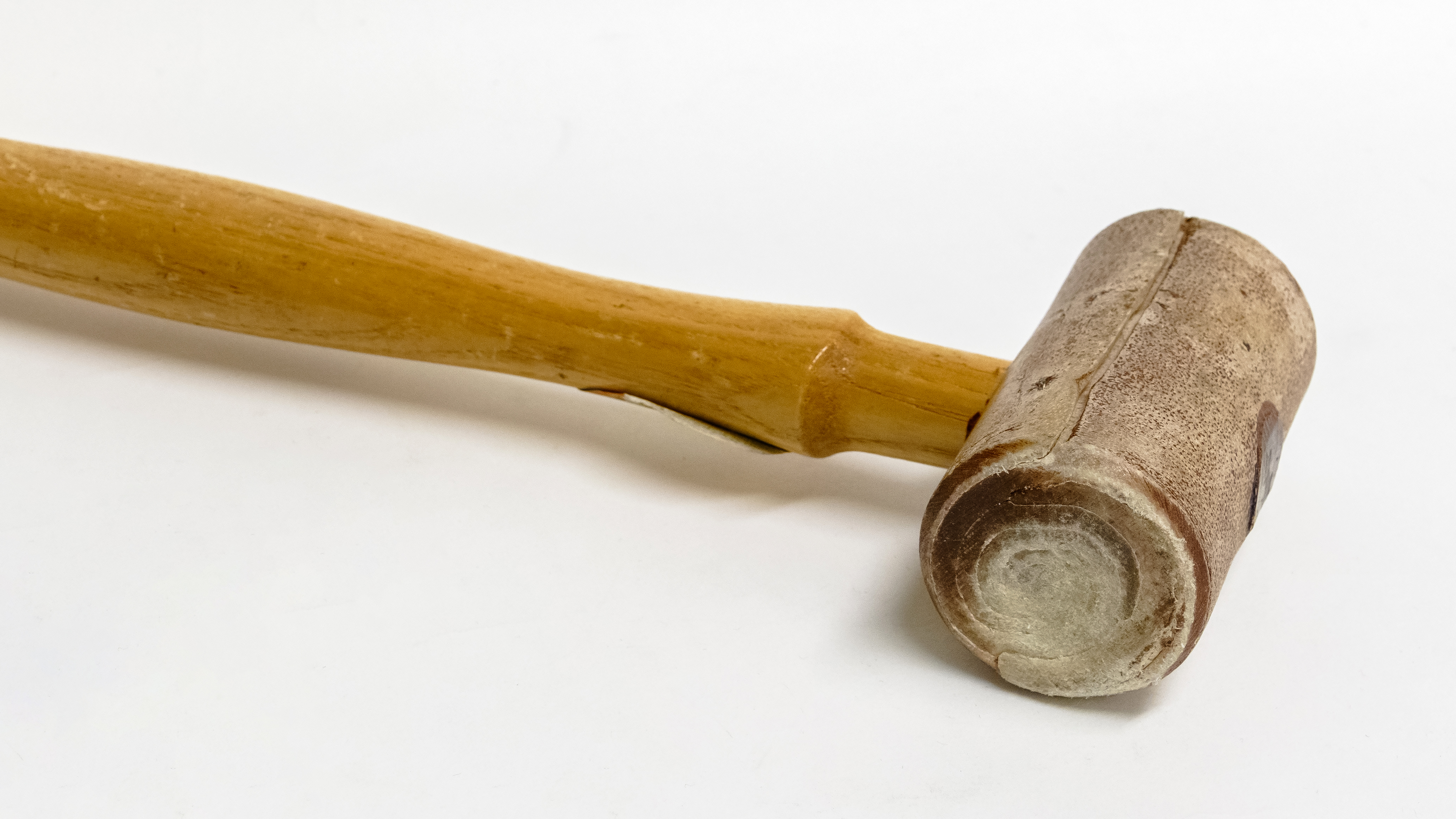
Rawhide mallet

Soft hammers, or mallets, are also made with rolled rawhide dipped in shellac: these hammers are mostly used to work soft metals without marring them (by jewelers, brass instrument repairmen, boilermakers etc.).

=== Shoes ===
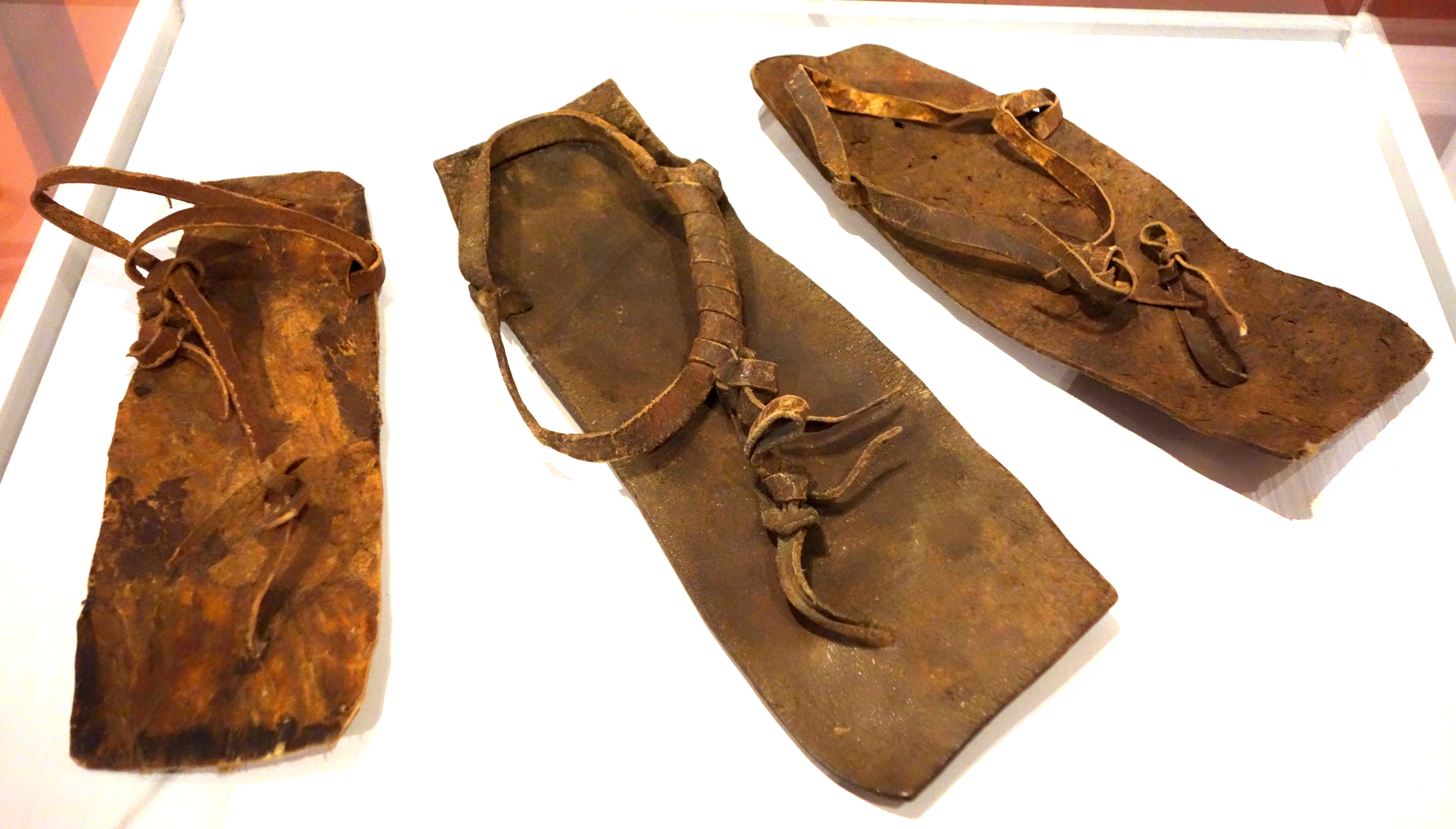
Maasai sandals exhibit in Bata Shoe Museum, city of Toronto, Ontario province, Canada.

Traditional gaucho's "boots" are made with horse feet rawhide. Gauchos skin the animal and put the freshly skinned hides on their feet like socks, where they are left to dry, taking the user's feet shape. Like moccasins they are soft-soled. Like ancient Roman cothurnus, the rudimentary boots have no toe box and do not cover the toes completely.

=== Dog chew ===
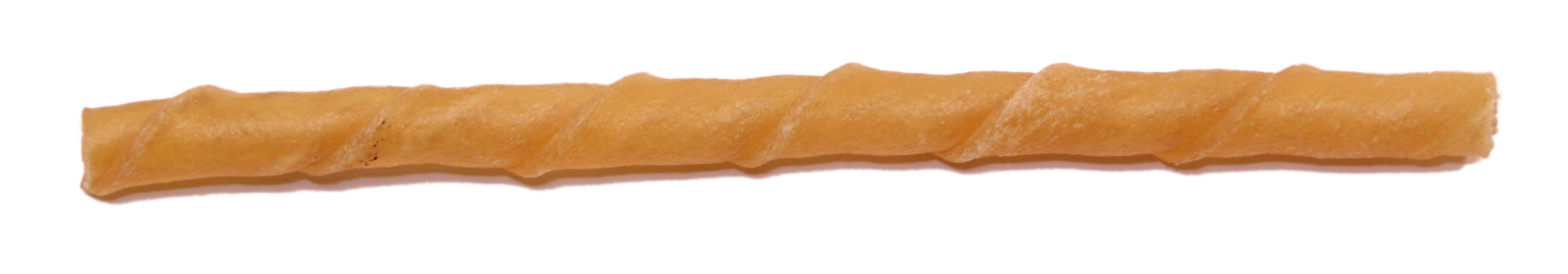
Rawhide chew stick for dogs

Rawhide is used in many dog chews. Some veterinarians discourage the giving of rawhide to dogs because of the animal's inability to digest the rawhide properly, sometimes causing bowel obstruction that is fatal if left untreated.

The American Kennel Club noted that the safety of rawhide dog chews depends on the dog. While smaller, softer-chewing dogs wear the rawhide down over time into safe, soft particles, larger dogs capable of breaking off and ingesting intact chunks of hard rawhide can experience intestinal blockages.

=== Garrotte / Medical uses ===
Wet rawhide has been used by some earlier cultures as a means of torture or execution, gradually biting into or squeezing the flesh of body parts it encloses as it dries. An example is buskin. On the other hand, it has also been used in the context of medicine by First Nations peoples, and other groups such as the Sioux Nation: wet rawhide would be wrapped around a long bone fracture and it would dry, slowly setting the bone; the dried rawhide then served to support the fracture, similar to how a plaster cast does today.

=== Boat ===
The pelota was an improvised rawhide boat used for crossing rivers in South and Central America.
