= Cat play and toys =

Entertainment of domestic cats

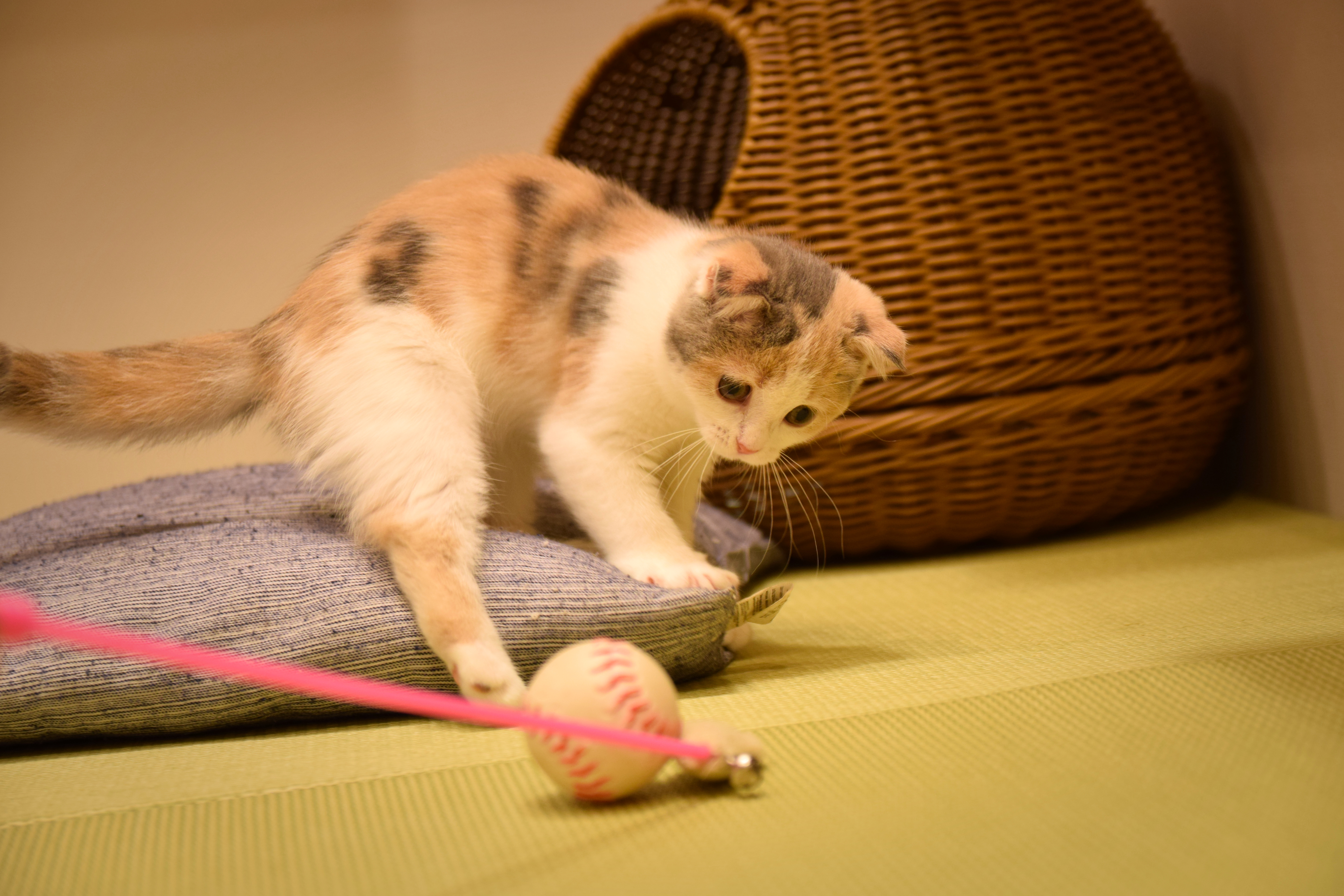
Kitten play-hunting a stick moved by its human owner

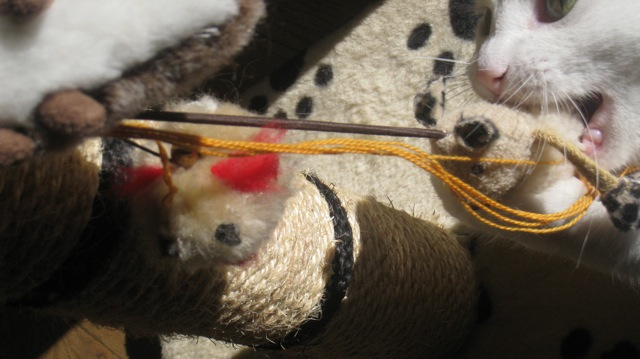
Cat chewing on a toy

Cat play and toys incorporates predatory games of "play aggression". Cats' behaviors when playing are similar to hunting behaviors. These activities allow kittens and younger cats to grow and acquire cognitive and motor skills, and to socialize with other cats. Cat play behavior can be either solitary (with toys or other objects) or social (with animals and people). They can play with a multitude of toys ranging from strings, to small furry toys resembling prey (e.g. mice), to plastic bags.

== Defining cat play ==
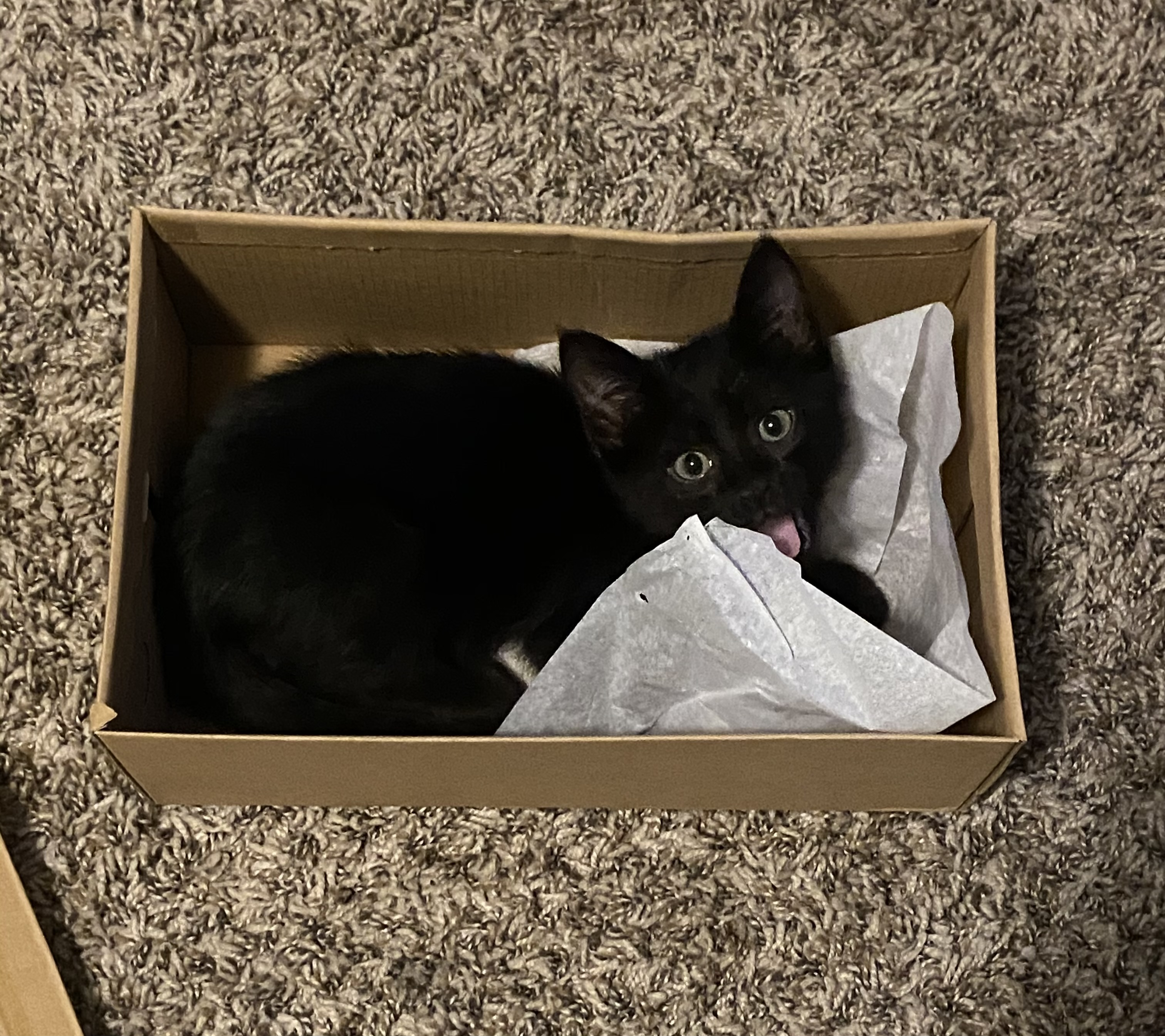
Cats are known to climb into empty boxes.

Object play for cats is the use of inanimate objects by the animal to express play behavior . In the case of pet domestic cats, humans normally provide them with purchased, human-made toys such as toy mice, bird or feather toys, or toy insects. These may be suspended from a string attached to a wooden or fishing-style rod designed to simulate lifelike activity in the toy, triggering the cat's predatory instincts – this game is known as catfishing. Cat play can be enriched with the addition of obstacles behind which the prey can hide and items that make sound when the toy moves through them such as dried leaves, grass, or even a paper bag. When it comes to non-domestic, wild cats, they may use several objects in the wilderness as their toys including sticks, leaves, rocks, feathers, etc. Play behaviour includes throwing, chasing, biting, and capturing the toy object, mimicking behaviors used during an interaction with a real source of prey. Engaging in object play helps young cats practice these adult skills.

There are several different motor patterns associated with the play behaviour of cats and they have during the day different roles in the social context. Pouncing is used to initiate play through physical contact. Kittens exhibit their preference for physical contact play by rolling and exposing the abdomen and rearing up on the hind legs. Chasing and horizontal leaping are examples of motor patterns that may be used to end play. The varying speed and directional movement of a cat's tail can be a useful indicator of its level of playfulness.

== Development of play in kittens ==
Play in cats is a behaviour that first emerges in kittens. Compared to adult cats, kittens generally need greater intensity and longer durations of play. Some important developmental aspects of play behaviour include motor development, social behaviour and cognitive development. There are different types of play that develop at different stages during the development and growth of a kitten. The first play behaviours observed in kittens include approaching, pawing and holding onto each other. Following this stage in their development, kittens begin to show an interest in inanimate objects and prey behaviour. This is the development of their nonsocial behaviour in which they become more independent and begin to practice predatory/hunting behaviour. Play behaviour in kittens is also important in providing physical exercise as they are growing, as well as providing a means of interacting with other members of their litter to foster strong social bonds. Social play is important between litter-mates since this is the main source of play for kittens in early life, as they are limited in the room needed to explore other means of play. Engaging in this social play behaviour is important until they have access to other play objects, such as toys.

== Relation to predation ==
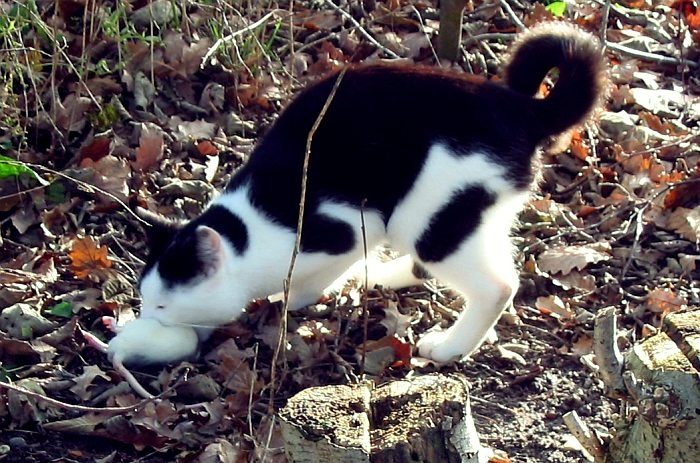
Predation

Since cats are meat-eating predators, nearly all cat games are predatory games. Playing with live prey caught while hunting may be distinguished as a separate concept from playing with other cats or with humans, although the two look much the same to the human eye. It is suggested that ‘playing’ with prey is a behaviour evolved to avoid injury to the hunting cat by wearing down the caught prey before closing in to eat it. Predatory play would then be a part of hunting behaviour.

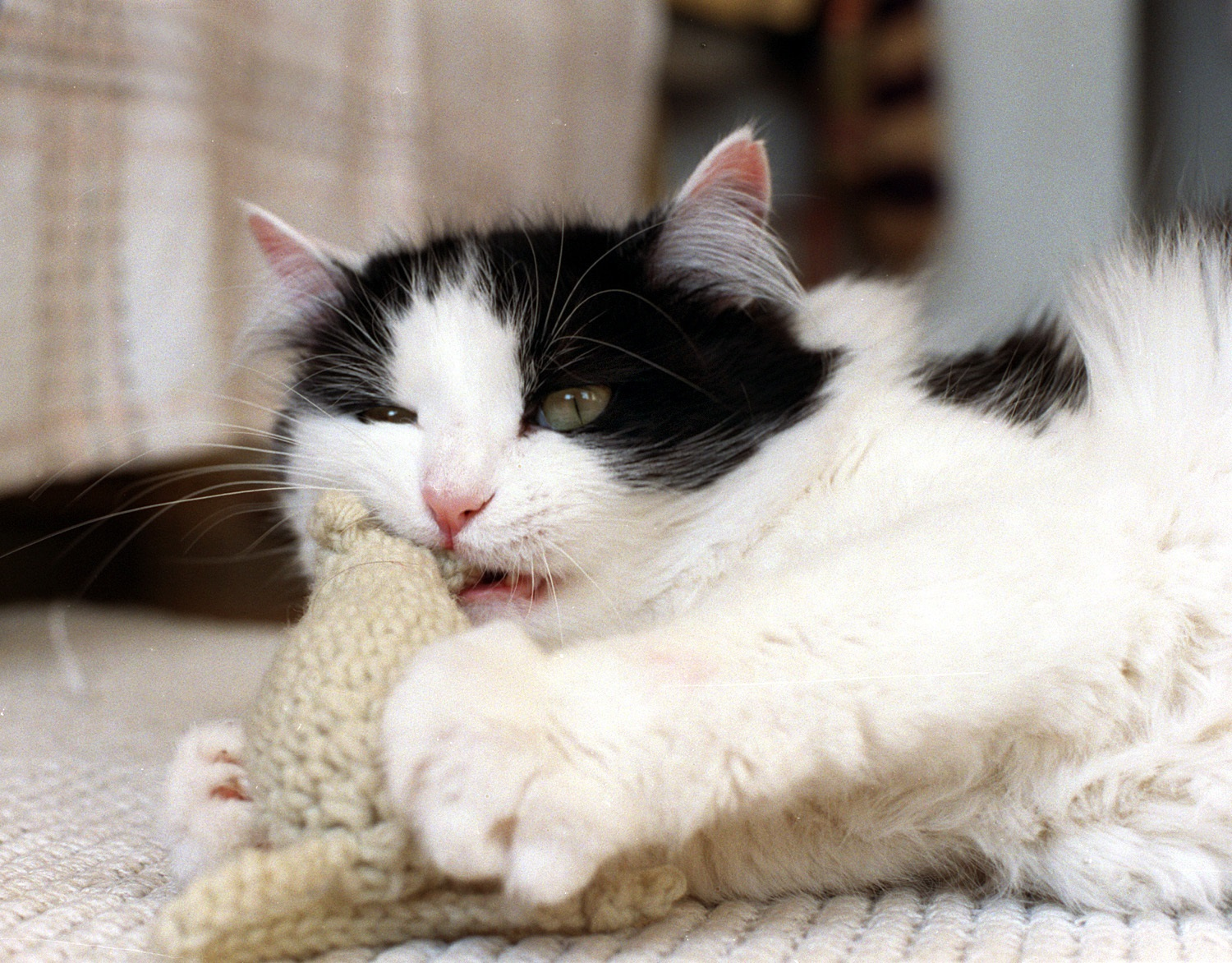
Cat and toy mouse

Predators often encounter prey that attempt to escape predation. Cats often play more with toys that behave like prey trying to flee than with toys that mimic confrontational prey by moving towards the cat with an aggressive or defensive posture.

=== Success rate ===
Success rate is important in play. A cat that catches its "prey" every time soon gets bored, and a cat that is never successful at capture can lose interest. The ideal hunting success rate is one successful capture for every three to six attempts. Capturing prey at this rate generally maximizes a cat's interest in the game.

=== Food ===
Catching prey and eating it are two closely related but separate activities. Domestic cats often store caught food for later consumption. In the wild, eating occurs at the end of the chase once the prey is caught; therefore, incorporating food into hunting games tends to end the interest in play. Hidden treats, however, help engage the cat's senses, such as sense of smell, and can be a form of play that enables them to utilize their searching skills.

=== Influence of hunger on cat behaviour ===
Hunger has been shown to increase the intensity in the play behaviour of cats, and a decrease in fear elicited by larger-sized toys. This effect that hunger has on play behaviour may be attributed to the cat's level of hunting experience. A hungry cat with a high level of hunting experience is more likely to engage in predatory behaviours than a less experienced cat, who will exhibit play behaviours since it is not able to engage in actual predatory activities.

== Precautions ==
If playing with a human's bare hands, a cat will generally resist using its claws or biting too hard (known as bite inhibition). However, play is about predatory behaviour, and a highly excited cat can unintentionally inflict minor injuries to other playmates in the form of light scratches or small puncture wounds from biting too hard. With most cats, it is wise to keep playthings at least 20 cm (8") away from fingers or eyes. Cats' claws and mouths contain bacteria that can lead to infection, so it is wise to clean and treat any wounds with an antiseptic solution and seek professional medical services if the wound becomes infected.

== See also ==
- Cat exercise wheel
- Catnip
- Scratching post
- Cat tree
