= Biocomputing =

Biocomputing may refer to:

- Biological computing, systems of biologically derived molecules that perform computational processes
  - DNA computing, a form of biological computing that uses DNA
- Bioinformatics, the application of statistics and computer science to the field of molecular biology
