= Cyclic enzyme system =

System of two enzymes sharing a single substrate

A cyclic enzyme system is a theoretical system of two enzymes sharing a single substrate or cofactor, also referred to as a biochemical switching device. It has been used as a biochemical implementation of a simple computational device, acting as a chemical diode.

== See also ==
- Biocomputer
- Computational gene
