= Kenichi Morita =

Japanese computer scientist (1949–2025)

Kenichi Morita (Japanese: 森田憲一, 30 March 1949 – 19 July 2025) was a Japanese computer scientist known for his research on reversible computing, cellular automata, and reversible cellular automata. He was a professor emeritus at Hiroshima University. His contributions include showing that reversible cellular automata and reversible two-counter machines could be Turing-complete, and solving the firing squad synchronization problem for reversible cellular automata.

== Life and career ==
Morita was the son of an electrical engineer, born in Osaka, on 30 March 1949. He took up electronics as a hobby in high school, and studied biophysical engineering at the University of Osaka beginning in 1967. He began working with cellular automata in 1970, supervised by Kazuhiro Sugata and inspired by the recent publication of Martin Gardner's columns in Scientific American on Conway's Game of Life. In 1972, he published his first scientific paper, in Japanese, on the simulation of a computer within a two-dimensional cellular automaton. He received his bachelor's degree from the University of Osaka in 1971, and his master's degree in 1973.

He worked as a researcher at Osaka University from 1974 until 1987, and defended his doctoral thesis in 1978. In this period he also married, had three children, and took up running as a hobby. His interest in reversible computing began in the mid-1980s, and in 1989 he published his first paper in this area, showing that reversible Turing machines can simulate arbitrary Turing machines.

In 1987 he moved from Osaka University to Yamagata University, as an associate professor in the faculty of engineering; he was promoted to full professor in 1990. He moved again, to Hiroshima University, in 1993. He retired as professor emeritus in 2013, and died of kidney failure on 19 July 2025, at the age of 76.

== Books ==
Morita's books include:

- 可逆計算 [Reversible Computing] (Kindai Kagaku Sha, 2012)
- Theory of Reversible Computing (EATCS Monographs in Theoretical Computer Science, Springer, 2017, doi:10.1007/978-4-431-56606-9)
- Reversible World Of Cellular Automata: Fantastic Phenomena and Computing in Artificial Reversible Universe (WSPC Book Series in Unconventional Computing 4, World Scientific, 2025, doi:10.1142/13516)

A festschrift was published in his honor in 2018: Reversibility and Universality: Essays Presented to Kenichi Morita on the Occasion of His 70th Birthday (Andrew Adamatzky, ed., Emergence, Complexity and Computation, Springer, 2018, doi:10.1007/978-3-319-73216-9).
