= Molecular logic gate =

Molecule that performs a logical operation

A molecular logic gate is a molecule that performs a logical operation based on at least one physical or chemical inputs and a single output. The field has advanced from simple logic systems based on a single chemical or physical input to molecules capable of combinatorial and sequential operations such as arithmetic operations (i.e. moleculators and memory storage algorithms). Molecular logic gates work with input signals based on chemical processes and with output signals based on spectroscopic phenomena.

Logic gates are the fundamental building blocks of computers, microcontrollers and other electrical circuits that require one or more logical operations. They can be used to construct digital architectures with varying degrees of complexity by a cascade of a few to several million logic gates, and are essentially physical devices that produce a singular binary output after performing logical operations based on Boolean functions on one or more binary inputs. The concept of molecular logic gates, extending the applicability of logic gates to molecules, aims to convert chemical systems into computational units. The field has evolved to realize several practical applications in fields such as molecular electronics, biosensing, DNA computing, nanorobotics, and cell imaging.

== Working principle ==
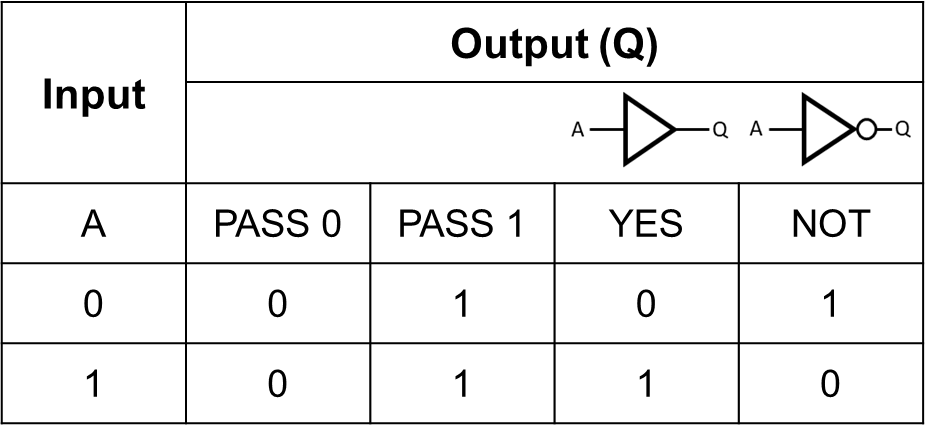
Select single-input logic gates with truth tables

For logic gates with a single input, there are four possible output patterns. When the input is 0, the output can be either a 0 or 1. When the input is 1, the output can again be 0 or 1. The four output bit patterns correspond to a specific logic type: PASS 0, YES, NOT, and PASS 1. PASS 0 and PASS 1 always outputs 0 and 1, respectively, regardless of input. YES outputs a 1 when the input is 1, and NOT is the inverse of YES – it outputs a 0 when the input is 1.

AND, OR, XOR, NAND, NOR, XNOR, and INH are two-input logic gates. The AND, OR, and XOR gates are fundamental logic gates, and the NAND, NOR, and XNOR gates are complementary to AND, OR, and XOR gates, respectively. An INHIBIT (INH) gate is a special conditional logic gate that includes a prohibitory input. When the prohibitory input is absent, the output produced depends solely on the other input.

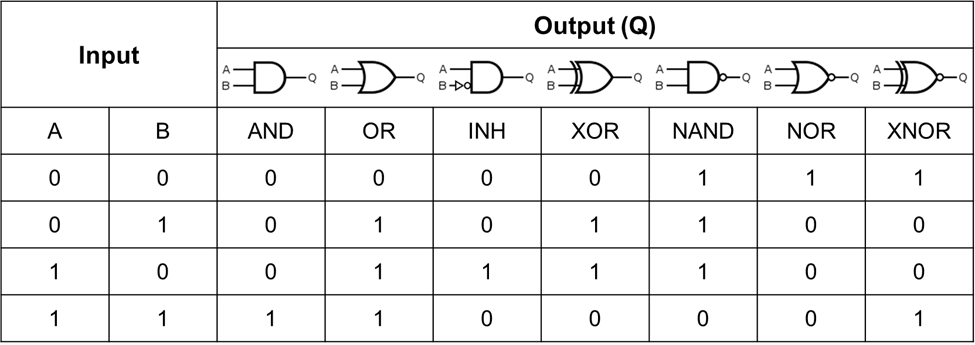
Select dual-input logic gates with symbols and truth tables

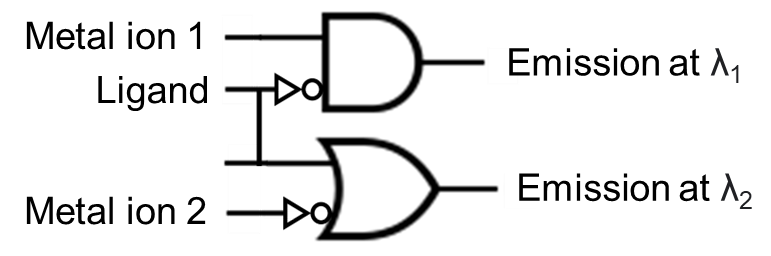
Block structure of a dual-input combinational molecular logic gate with metal ions as inputs (input "1") and fluorescence emission as output (output "1")

== History and development ==
One of the earliest ideas for the use of π-conjugated molecules in molecular computation was proposed by Ari Aviram from IBM in 1988.

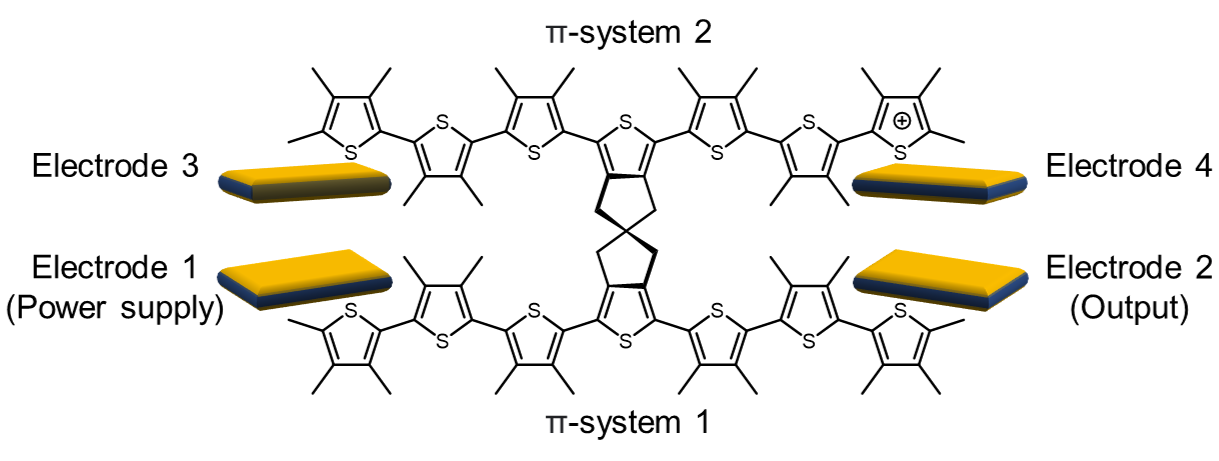
Schematic of a proposed molecular electronic switch by Aviram

The first practical realization of molecular logic was by de Silva et al. in their seminal work, in which they constructed a molecular photoionic AND gate with a fluorescent output. While a YES molecular logic gate can convert signals from their ionic to photonic forms, they are singular-input-singular-output systems. To build more complex molecular logic architectures, two-input gates, namely AND and OR gates, are needed. Some early works made some progress in this direction, but they could not realize a complete truth table as their protonated ionic forms could not bind to the substrate in every case. De Silva et al. constructed an anthracene-based AND gate made up of tertiary amine and benzo-18-crown-6 units, both of which were known to show photoinduced electron transfer (PET) processes. The two molecules acted as receptors that were connected to the anthracene-based fluorophore by alkyl spacers. The PET is quenched upon coordination with protons and sodium ions, respectively, for the two receptors, and would cause the anthracene unit to fluoresce.

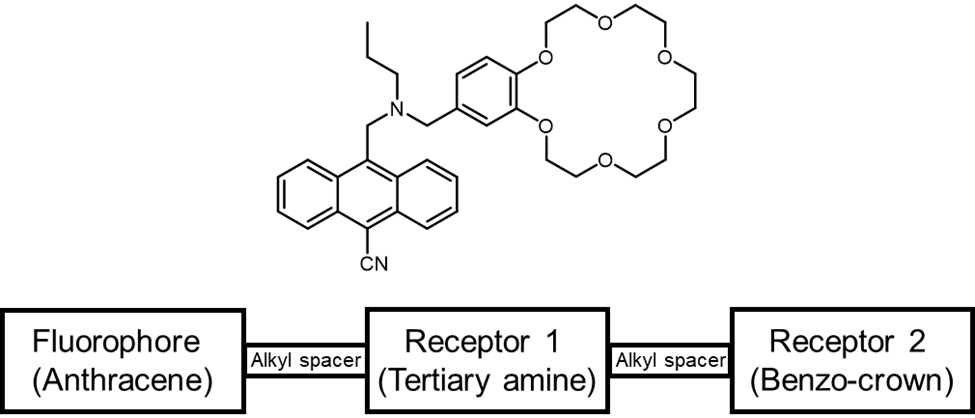
A molecular AND gate

== Examples of molecular logic gates ==
=== YES molecular logic gate ===
An example of a YES logic gate comprises a benzo-crown-ether connected to a cyano-substituted anthracene unit. An output of 1 (fluorescence) is obtained only when sodium ions are present in the solution (indicating an input of 1). Sodium ions are encapsulated by the crown ether, resulting in a quenching of the PET process and causing the anthracene unit to fluoresce.

A YES molecular logic gate

=== AND molecular logic gate ===
This molecular logic gate illustrates the advancement from redox-fluorescent switches to multi-input logic gates with an electrochemical switch, detecting the presence of acids. This two-input AND logic gate incorporates a tertiary amine proton receptor and a tetrathiafulvalene redox donor. These groups, when attached to anthracene, can simultaneously process information concerning the concentration of the acid and oxidizing ability of the solution.

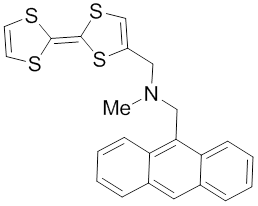
A two-input AND molecular logic gate sensor for protons and electrons

=== OR molecular logic gate ===
De Silva et al. constructed an OR molecular logic gate using an aza-crown ether receptor and sodium and potassium ions as the inputs. Either of the two ions could bind to the crown ether, causing the PET to be quenched and the fluorescence to be turned on. Since either of the two ions (input "1") could cause fluorescence (output "1"), the system resembled an OR logic gate.

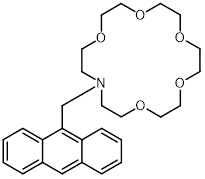
A two-input molecular OR logic gate

=== INH molecular logic gate ===
The INH logic gate incorporates a Tb^{3+} ion in a chelate complex. This two-input logic gate displays non-commutative behavior with chemical inputs and a phosphorescence output. Whenever dioxygen (input "1") is present, the system is quenched and no phosphorescence is observed (output "0"). The second input, H^{+}, must also be present for an output "1" to be observed.

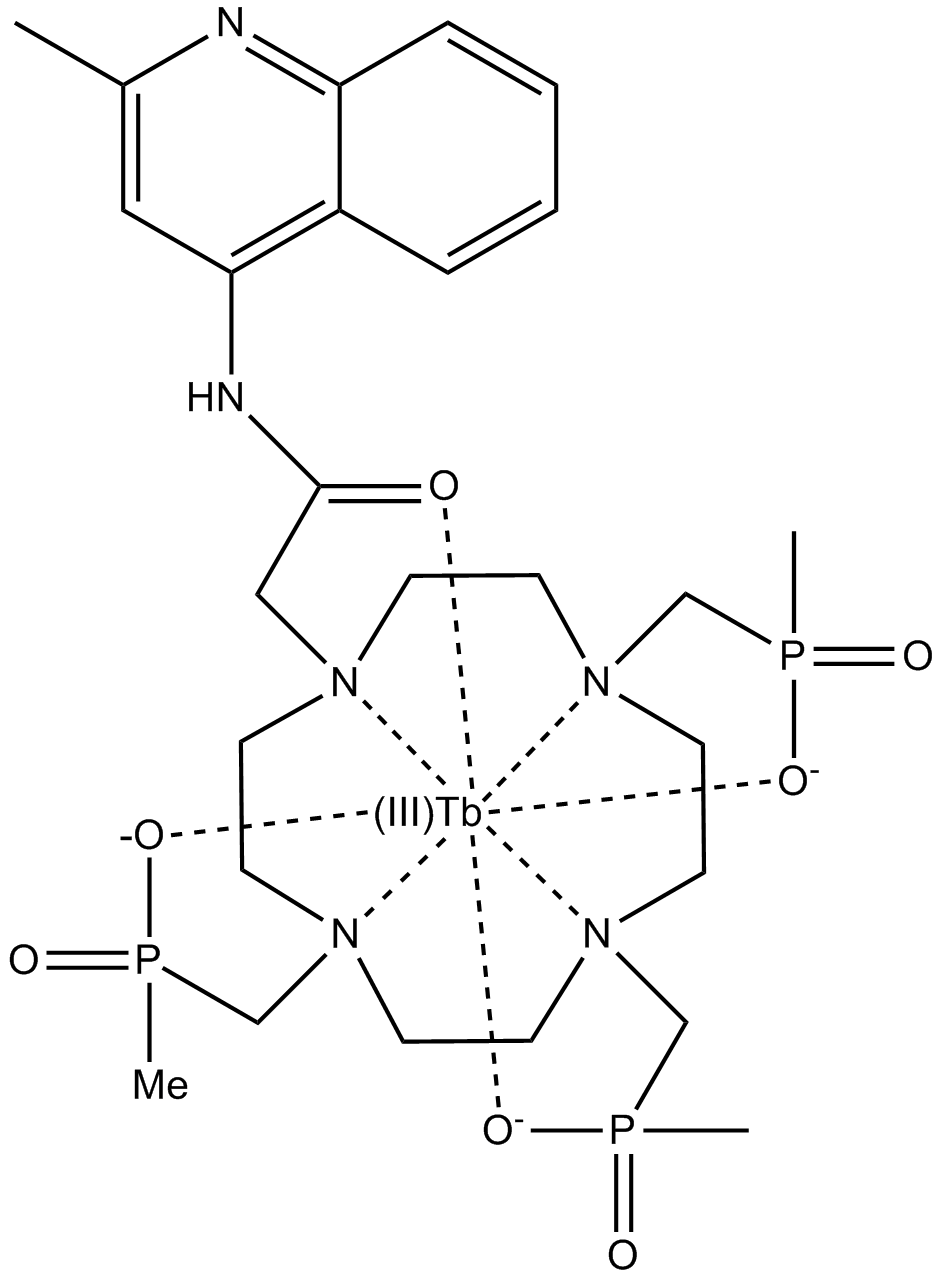
A two-input molecular INH logic gate

=== NAND molecular logic gate ===
Parker and Williams constructed a NAND logic gate based on strong emission from a terbium complex of phenanthridine. When acid and oxygen (the two inputs) are absent (input "0"), the terbium center fluoresces (output "1").

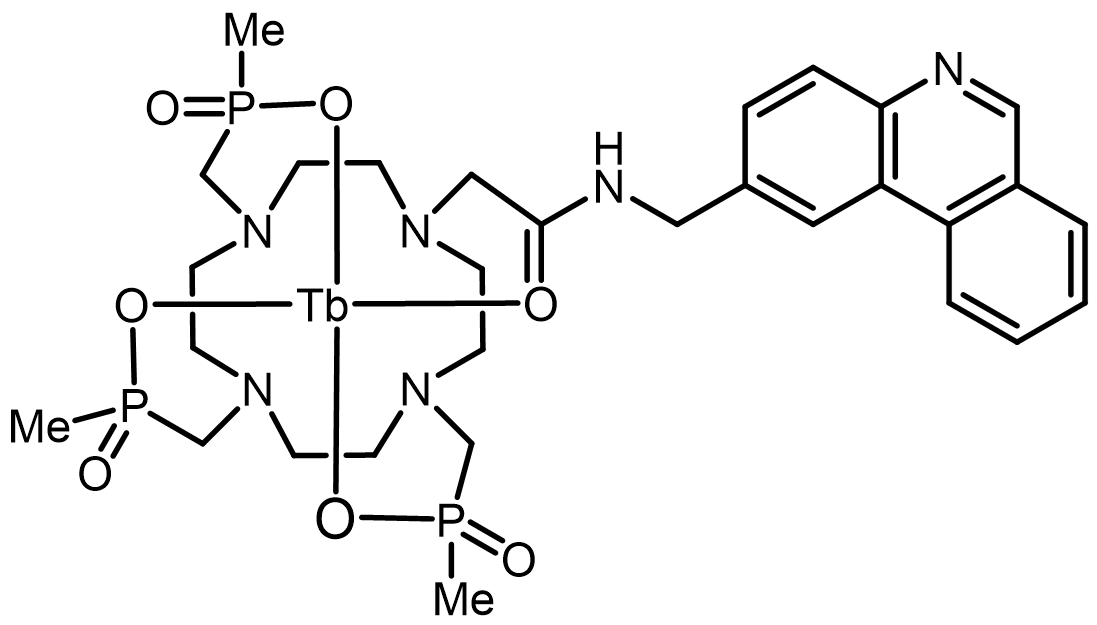
A two-input molecular NAND logic gate

=== NOR molecular logic gate ===
Akkaya and coworkers demonstrated a molecular NOR gate using a boradiazaindacene system. Fluorescence of the highly-emissive boradiazaindacene (input "1") was found to be quenched in the presence of either a zinc salt [Zn(II)] or trifluoroacetic acid (TFA).

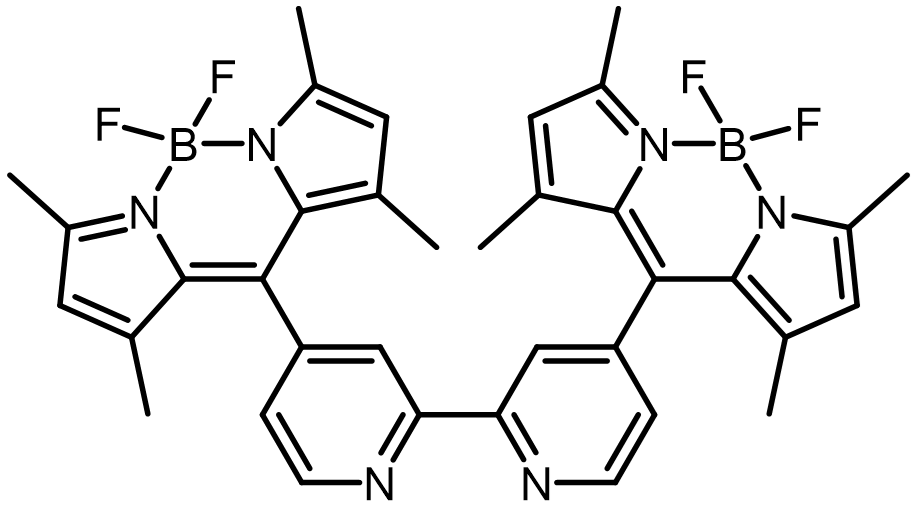
A two-input molecular NOR logic gate

=== XOR and XNOR molecular logic gates ===
Redshift (shift to longer wavelengths) and blueshift (shift to shorter wavelengths)

De Silva and McClenaghan designed a proof-of-principle arithmetic device based on molecular logic gates. Compound A is a push-pull olefin with the top receptor containing four carboxylic acid anion groups (and non-disclosed counter cations) capable of binding to calcium. The bottom part is a quinoline molecule which is a receptor for hydrogen ions. The logic gate operates as follows: without any chemical input of Ca^{2+} or H^{+}, the chromophore shows a maximum absorbance in UV/VIS spectroscopy at 390 nm. When calcium is introduced, a hypsochromic shift (blue shift) takes place and the absorbance at 390 nm decreases; likewise, an addition of protons causes a bathochromic shift (red shift). When both cations are in water, the net result is absorption at the original 390 nm wavelength. This system represents an XNOR logic gate in absorption and an XOR logic gate in transmittance.

In another XOR logic gate system, the chemistry is based on pseudorotaxane. In organic solution the electron-deficient diazapyrenium salt (rod) and the electron-rich 2,3-dioxynaphthalene units of the crown ether (ring) self-assemble by formation of a charge transfer complex. An added tertiary amine like tributylamine forms a 1:2 adduct with the diazapyrene and the complex gets dethreaded. This process is accompanied by an increase in emission intensity at 343 nm resulting from freed crown ether. Added trifluoromethanesulfonic acid reacts with the amine and the process is reverted. Excess acid locks the crown ether by protonation and the complex is de-threaded again.

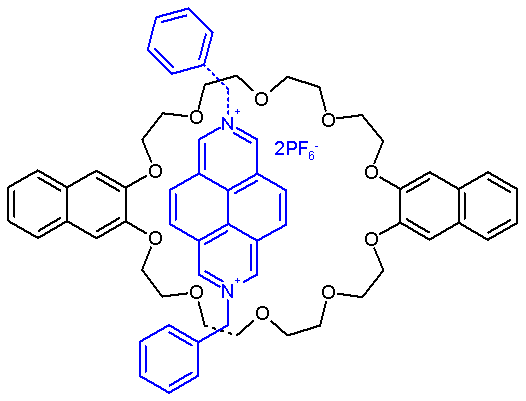
A pseudorotaxane-based logic gate

=== Half-adder and half-subtractor molecular circuits ===
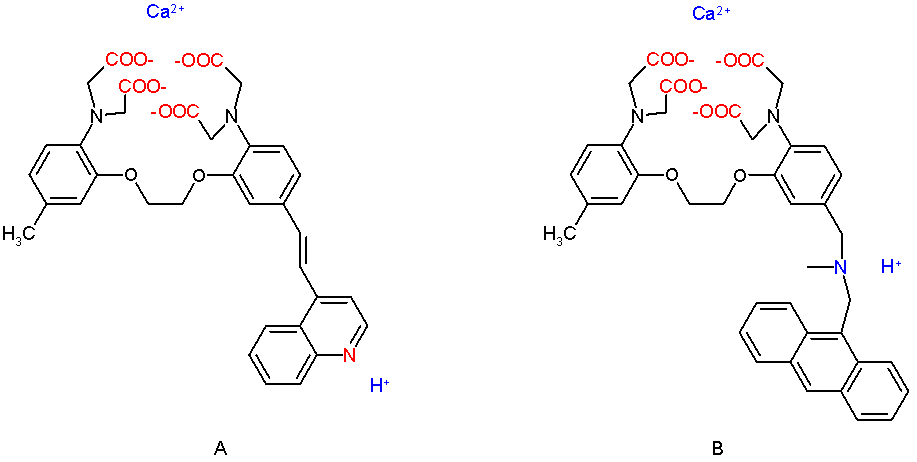
A. A multi-functional dual-input XNOR/XOR molecular logic gate; B. A triple-input half-adder system based on AND gates.

In compound B, the bottom section contains a tertiary amino group that is capable of binding to protons. In this system, fluorescence only occurs when both cations are present. The presence of both cations hinders PET, allowing compound B to fluoresce. In the absence of either ion, fluorescence is quenched by PET, which involves an electron transfer from either the nitrogen atom or the oxygen atoms, or both to the anthracenyl group. When both receptors are bound to calcium ions and protons respectively, both PET channels are shut off. The overall result of Compound B is AND logic, since an output of "1" (fluorescence) occurs only when both Ca^{2+} and H^{+} are present in solution, that is, have values as "1". With both systems running in parallel and the monitoring of transmittance for system A and fluorescence for system B, the result is a half-adder capable of reproducing the equation 1 + 1 = 2.

In a modification of system B, three chemical inputs are simultaneously processed in an AND logic gate. An enhanced fluorescence signal is observed only in the presence of excess protons, zinc and sodium ions through interactions with their respective amine, phenyldiaminocarboxylate, and crown ether receptors. The processing mode operates similarly as discussed above – fluorescence is observed due to the prevention of competing PET reactions from the receptors to the excited anthracene fluorophore. The absence of any ion input results in a low fluorescence output. Each receptor is selective for its specific ion as an increase in the concentration of the other ions does not yield a high fluorescence. The specific concentration threshold of each input must be reached to achieve a fluorescent output in accordance with combinatorial AND logic.

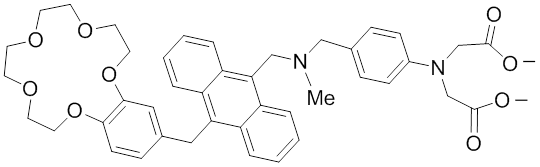
A triple-input half-adder system based on AND gates

=== More complex molecular logic circuits ===
A molecular logic gate can process modulators much like the setup seen in de Silva's proof-of-principle, but incorporating different logic gates on the same molecule is challenging. Such a function is called integrated logic and is exemplified by the BODIPY-based, half-subtractor logic gate illustrated by Coskun, Akkaya, and their colleagues. When monitored at two different wavelengths, 565 and 660 nm, XOR and INH logic gates operations are realized at the respective wavelengths. Optical studies of this compound in tetrahydrofuran reveal an absorbance peak at 565 nm and an emission peak at 660 nm. Addition of an acid results in a hypsochromic shift of both peaks as protonation of the tertiary amine results in an internal charge transfer. The color of the emission observed is yellow. When a strong base is added, the phenolic hydroxyl group is deprotonated, effecting a PET that renders the molecule non-emissive. When an acid and base are added, the molecule is observed to give off a red emission, as the tertiary amine would not be protonated while the hydroxyl group would remain protonated, resulting in the absence of both PET and intramolecular charge transfer (ICT). Due to the great difference in emission intensity, this single molecule is capable of carrying out subtraction at a nanoscale level.

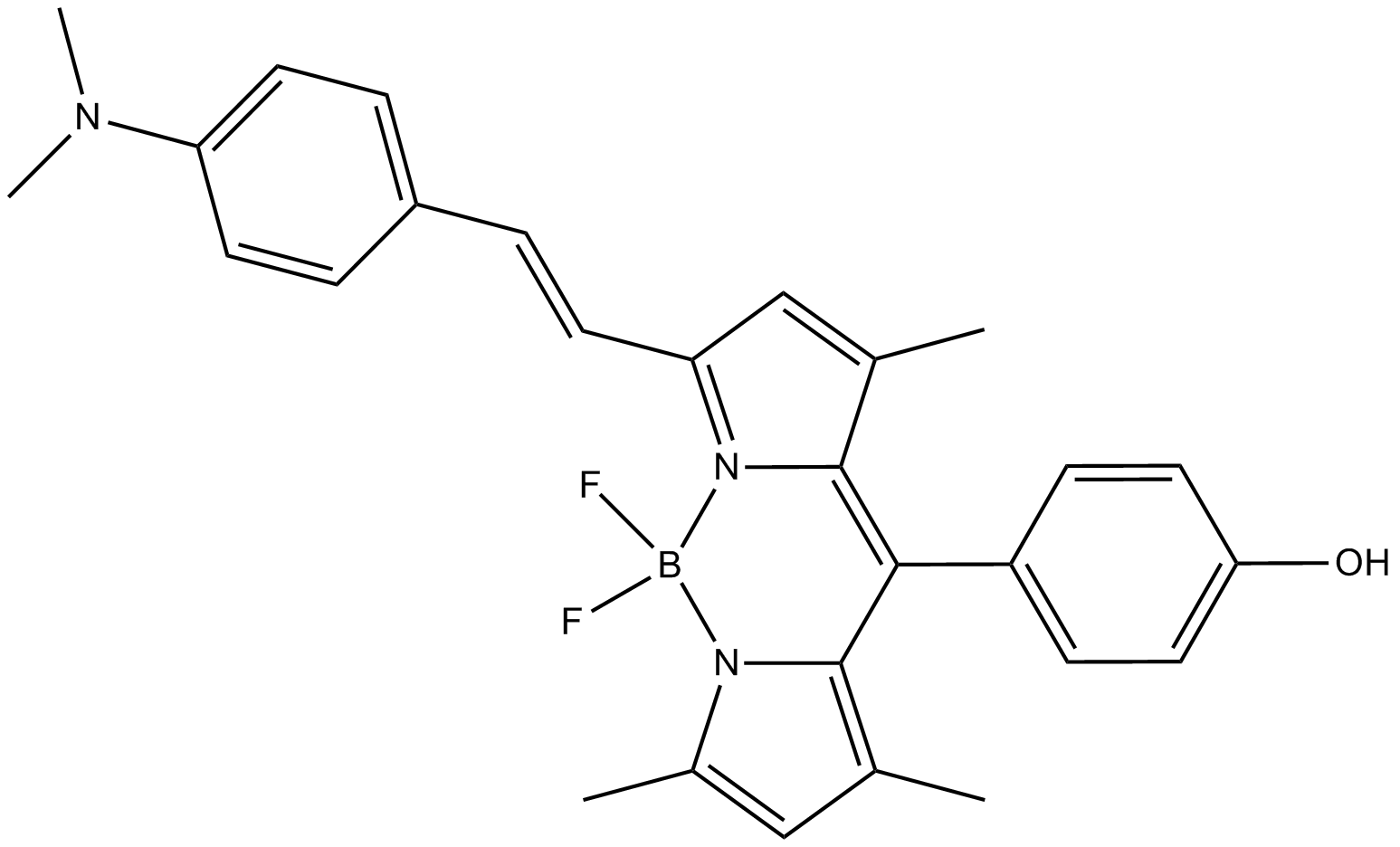
An integrated logic gate

A full adder system based on fluorescein has also been constructed by Shanzer et al. The system is able to compute 1+1+1=3.

== Potential applications ==
Over the years, the utility of molecular logic gates has been explored in a wide range of fields such as chemical and biological detection, the pharmaceutical and food industries, and the emerging fields of nanomaterials and chemical computing.

=== Chemical detection of ions ===
Fluoride (F^{−}) and acetate (CH_{3}COO^{−}) anions are among the most important ones in the context of human health and well-being. The former, used extensively in health care, is known for its toxicity and corrosiveness. The latter can cause alkalosis and affect metabolic pathways beyond a certain concentration. Hence, it is crucial to develop methods to detect these anions in aqueous media. Bhat et al.. constructed an INH gate with receptors that bind selectively to F^{‑} and CH_{3}COO^{−} anions. The system used changes in absorbance as a colorimetric-based output to detect the concentration of anions.

Wen and coworkers designed an INH molecular logic gate with Fe^{3+} and EDTA as the inputs and a fluorescent output for the detection of ferric ions in solutions. The fluorescence of the system is quenched if and only if Fe^{3+} input is present and EDTA is absent.

Heavy metal ions are a persistent threat to human health because of their inherent toxicity and low degradability. Several molecular logic gate-based systems have been constructed to detect ions such as Cd^{2+}, Hg^{2+}/Pb^{2+}, and Ag^{+}. In their work, Chen et al. demonstrated that logic gate-based systems could be used to detect Cd^{2+} ions in rice samples.

=== Biological applications ===
The effectiveness of methods such as chemotherapy to treat cancer tends to plateau after some time, as the cells undergo molecular changes that render them insensitive to the effect of anticancer drugs, making the early detection of cancerous cells important. A biomarker, microRNA (miRNA), is crucial in this detection via its expression patterns. Zhang et al. have demonstrated an INH-OR gate cascade for the purpose, Yue et al. used an AND gate to construct a system with two miRNA inputs and a quantum dot photoluminescence output, and Peng et al. also constructed an AND gate-based dual-input system for the simultaneous detection of miRNAs from tumor cells.

Akkaya et al. illustrated the application of a logic gate for photodynamic therapy in their work. A BODIPY dye attached to a crown ether and two pyridyl groups separated by spacers works according to an AND logic gate. The molecule works as a photodynamic agent upon irradiation at 660 nm under conditions of relatively high sodium and proton ion concentrations by converting triplet oxygen to cytotoxic singlet oxygen. This prototypical example uses higher sodium levels and lower pH in tumor tissue compared to the levels in normal cells. When these two cancer-related cellular parameters are satisfied, a change is observed in the absorbance spectrum.

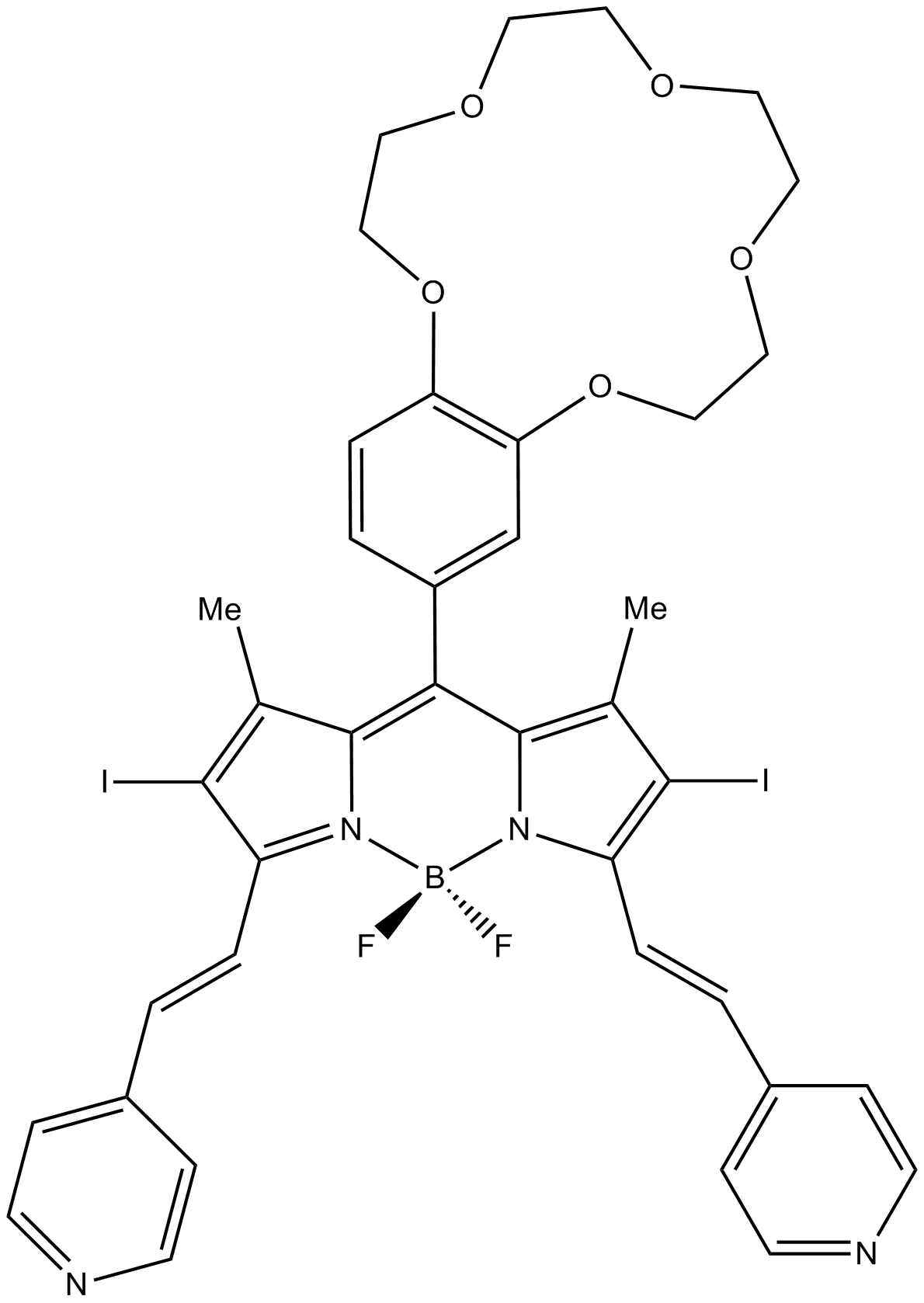
Two-input AND logic gate with photodynamic therapeutic applications.

=== DNA computing and logic calculation ===
The concept of DNA computing arose from addressing storage density issues because of the increasing volumes of data information. Theoretically, a gram of single-stranded DNA is capable of storing over 400 exabytes of data at a density of two bits per nucleotide. Leonard Adleman is credited with having established the field in 1994. Recently, molecular logic gate systems have been utilized in DNA computing models.

Massey et al. constructed photonic DNA molecular logic circuits using cascades of AND, OR, NAND, and NOR molecular logic gates. They used lanthanide complexes as fluorescent markers, and their luminescent outputs were detected by FRET-based devices at the terminals of DNA strands. Works by Campbell et al. on demonstrating NOT, AND, OR, and XNOR logic systems based on DNA crossover tiles, Bader et al. on manipulating the DNA G-quadruplex structure to realize YES, AND, and OR logic operations, and Chatterjee and coworkers on constructing logic gates using reactive DNA hairpins on DNA origami surfaces are some examples of logic gate-based DNA computing.

=== Nanorobotics and advanced machines ===
Nanorobots have the potential to transform drug delivery processes and biological computing. Llopis-Lorente et al. developed a nanorobot that can perform logic operations and process information on glucose and urea. Thubagere et al. designed a DNA molecular nanorobot capable of sorting chemical cargo. The system could work without additional power as the robot was capable of walking across the DNA origami surface on its two feet. It also had an arm to transport cargo.

Margulies et al. demonstrated molecular sequential logic, where they created a molecular keypad lock resembling the processing capabilities of an electronic security device, which is equivalent to incorporates several interconnected AND logic gates in parallel. The molecule mimics an electronic keypad of an automated teller machine. The output signals are dependent not only on the presence of inputs but also on a correct order; i.e. the correct password must be entered. The molecule was designed using pyrene and fluorescein fluorophores connected by a siderophore, which binds to Fe(III), and the acidity of the solution changes the fluorescence properties of the fluorescein fluorophore.

Molecular logic gate systems can theoretically overcome the problems arising when semiconductors approach nano-dimensions. Molecular logic gates are more versatile than their silicon counterparts, with phenomena such as superposed logic unavailable to semiconductor electronics. Dry molecular gates, such as the one demonstrated by Avouris and colleagues, prove to be possible substitutes for semiconductor devices due to their small size, similar infrastructure, and data processing abilities. Avouris revealed a NOT logic gate composed of a bundle of carbon nanotubes. The nanotubes are doped differently in adjoining regions creating two complementary field effect transistors, and the bundle operates as a NOT logic gate only when satisfactory conditions are met.

== See also ==
- Molecular scale electronics
- Molecular machine
- Chemical computer
- Host-guest chemistry
- Molecular switch
- Photoswitch
- Molecular memory
- Quantum computing
- Unconventional computing
