= HPN =

HPN may refer to:

- Hapton railway station, England
- Higgs prime, $Hp_n$
- HPN (gene)
- Quaternionic projective space, $\mathbb{H}\mathrm{P}^n$
- Westchester County Airport, White Plains, New York, United States
