= MAYA-II =

MAYA-II (Molecular Array of YES and ANDNOT logic gates) is a DNA computer, based on DNA Stem Loop Controllers, developed by scientists at Columbia University and the University of New Mexico and created in 2006.

Replacing the normally silicon-based circuits, this chip has DNA strands to form the circuit. It is said that the speed of such DNA-circuited computer chips will rival and surpass the silicon-based ones, they will be of use in blood samples and in the body and might partake in single cell signaling.

It is the successor to the MAYA I which was composed of only 23 logic gates and could only complete specific games of tic-tac-toe. MAYA-II has more than 100 DNA circuits and can now thoroughly play a game of tic-tac-toe. It is very slow - one move in a game of tic-tac-toe can take up to 30 minutes making it more of a demonstration than an actual application.

The arrangement of this device looks like that of a tic-tac-toe grid and consists of nine wells coated with culture cells. The logic gates are made of the E6 Deoxyribozymes (or DNAzyme) which react to specific oligonucleotide input. Upon reaction, the DNAzyme cleaves the substrate producing an increase in red or green fluorescence, depending on whether it is the computer's or the human's turn respectively.

This technology was used to deepen the quality of diagnostics given to patients infected with the West Nile virus. Joanne Macdonald, a Columbia University virologist, hopes this device can be implanted in the human body and control the presence of cancer cells or the levels of insulin for diabetic patients.

One of the suggested uses put forward by MAYA's creators is that technology such as this can be used in situations where fluid is involved, such as in a sample of blood or a body, since it does not use traditional silicon components.
