= Transcriptor =

A transcriptor is a transistor-like device composed of DNA and RNA rather than a semiconducting material such as silicon. Prior to its invention in 2013, the transcriptor was considered an important component to build biological computers.

== Background ==
To function, a modern computer needs three different capabilities: It must be able to store information, transmit information between components, and possess a basic system of logic. Prior to March 2013, scientists had successfully demonstrated the ability to store and transmit data using biological components made of proteins and DNA. Simple two-terminal logic gates had been demonstrated, but required multiple layers of inputs and thus were impractical due to scaling difficulties.

== Invention and description ==
On March 28, 2013, a team of bioengineers from Stanford University led by Drew Endy announced that they had created the biological equivalent of a transistor, which they named a "transcriptor". That is, they created a three-terminal device with a logic system that can control other components. The transcriptor regulates the flow of RNA polymerase across a strand of DNA using special combinations of enzymes to control movement. According to project member Jerome Bonnet, "The choice of enzymes is important. We have been careful to select enzymes that function in bacteria, fungi, plants and animals, so that bio-computers can be engineered within a variety of organisms."

Transcriptors can replicate traditional AND, OR, NOR, NAND, XOR, and XNOR gates with equivalents, which Endy dubbed "Boolean Integrase Logic (BIL) gates", in a single-layer process (i.e., without requiring multiple instances of the simpler gates to build up more complex ones). Like a traditional transistor, a transcriptor can amplify an input signal. A group of transcriptors can do almost any type of computing, including counting and comparison.

== Impact ==
Stanford dedicated the BIL gate's design to the public domain, which may speed its adoption. According to Endy, other researchers were already using the gates to reprogram metabolism when the Stanford team published its research.

Computing by transcriptor is still very slow; it can take a few hours between receiving an input signal and generating an output. Endy doubted that biocomputers would ever be as fast as traditional computers, but added that is not the goal of his research. "We're building computers that will operate in a place where your cellphone isn't going to work", he said. Medical devices with built-in biological computers could monitor, or even alter, cell behavior from inside a patient's body. ExtremeTech writes:

Moving forward, though, the potential for real biological computers is immense. We are essentially talking about fully-functional computers that can sense their surroundings, and then manipulate their host cells into doing just about anything. Biological computers might be used as an early-warning system for disease, or simply as a diagnostic tool ... Biological computers could tell their host cells to stop producing insulin, to pump out more adrenaline, to reproduce some healthy cells to combat disease, or to stop reproducing if cancer is detected. Biological computers will probably obviate the use of many pharmaceutical drugs.

UC Berkeley biochemical engineer Jay Keasling said the transcriptor "clearly demonstrates the power of synthetic biology and could revolutionize how we compute in the future".
