= Andrew Adamatzky =

British computer scientist

- Citizenship: British
- Known for: Unconventional computing; chemical computers
- Scientific career
- Fields: Unconventional computing Cellular automata Reaction–diffusion systems
- Workplaces: University of the West of England, Bristol

Andrew Adamatzky is a British computer scientist, who is a Director of the Unconventional Computing Laboratory and Professor in Unconventional Computing at the Department of Computer Science and Creative Technology, University of the West of England, Bristol, United Kingdom.

Adamatzky is known for his research in unconventional computing. In particular, he has worked on chemical computers using reaction–diffusion processes. He has used slime moulds to plan potential routes for roadway systems and as components of nanorobotic systems, and discovered that they seek out valerian tablets, promoted as a herbal sedative, in preference to nutrients. He has also shown that the billiard balls in billiard-ball computers may be replaced by soldier crabs.

Adamatzky is also known for his continued research on fungal electrical spiking behavior, notably publishing the book Fungal Machines. In Fungal Machines, Adamatzky compiles many years work into one book.

Adamatzky is a director of the Unconventional Computing Laboratory, founding Editor-in-Chief of the Journal of Cellular Automata (OCP Science, 2005–) and the International Journal of Unconventional Computing (OCP Science, 2005–), and current Editor-in-Chief of Parallel Processing Letters (World Scientific, 2017–).

He appears in the 2014 documentary The Creeping Garden and in the 2019 documentary Le Blob.

== Bibliography ==
Adamatzky is also the author or co-author of several books:

- Identification of Cellular Automata (Taylor & Francis, 1994)
- Computing in Nonlinear Media and Automata Collectives (Institute of Physics, 2001)
- Dynamics of Crowd-Minds: Patterns of Irrationality in Emotions, Beliefs and Actions (World Scientific, 2005)
- Reaction-Diffusion Computers (with Ben De Lacy Costello and Tetsuya Asai, Elsevier, 2005)
- Physarum Machines: Computers from Slime Mould (World Scientific, 2010)
- Reaction-Diffusion Automata (Springer, 2013)
- The Silence of Slime Mould (Luniver Press, 2014) (an album of art works)

In addition he is the editor or co-editor of many edited volumes including publications made by PNAS and others.
