= Phospholipid phosphatase 3 =

Enzyme found in humans

PLPP3

Identifiers
- Aliases: PLPP3, Dri42, LPP3, PAP2B, VCIP, PPAP2B, phospholipid phosphatase 3
- External IDs: OMIM: 607125; MGI: 1915166; GeneCards: PLPP3
Enzyme activity
EC #	BRENDA	ExPASy	KEGG	MetaCyc
3.1.3.4	↗	↗	↗	↗

Gene location (Human)
Chr.	Chromosome 1 (human)
Band	1p32.2	Start	56,494,761 bp
Band	1p32.2	End	56,645,301 bp

Gene location (Mouse)
Chr.	Chromosome 4 (mouse)
Band	4 C6|4 49.18 cM	Start	105,014,544 bp
Band	4 C6|4 49.18 cM	End	105,089,961 bp
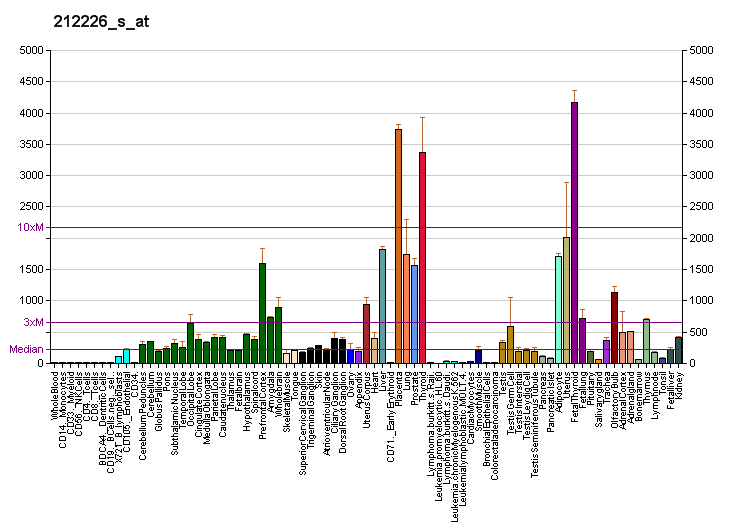

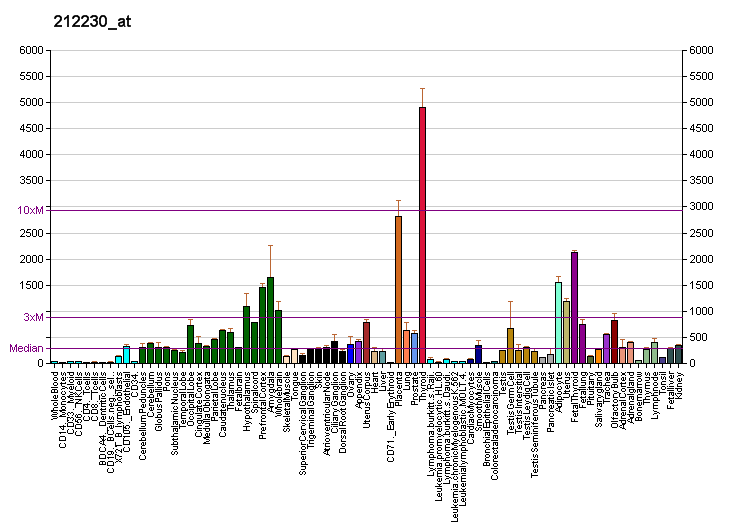

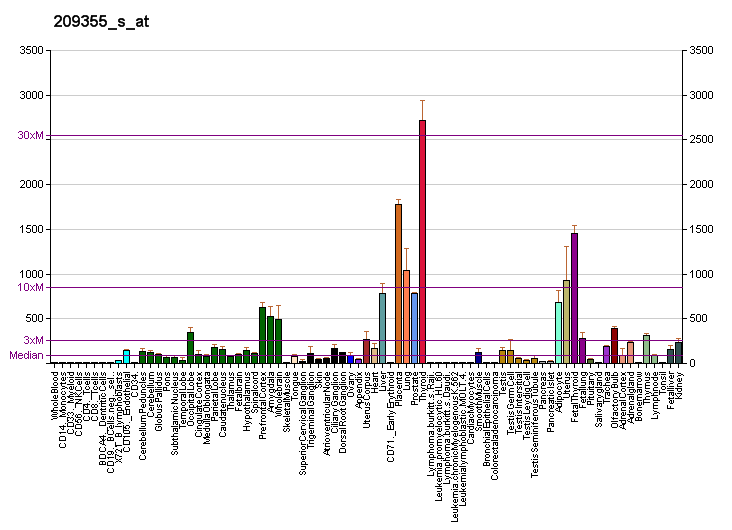
RNA expression pattern
Bgee	Human / Mouse (ortholog); Top expressed in: decidua; canal of the cervix; ventricular zone; right lobe of thyroid gland; urethra; left lobe of thyroid gland; left uterine tube; skin of hip; Achilles tendon; synovial joint / Top expressed in: vestibular membrane of cochlear duct; gastrula; decidua; Rostral migratory stream; globus pallidus; left lung; ankle; skin of external ear; deep cerebellar nuclei; right lung; More reference expression data
BioGPS	More reference expression data
Gene ontology
Molecular function	phosphoprotein phosphatase activity; protein binding; lipid phosphatase activity; hydrolase activity; phosphatidate phosphatase activity; sphingosine-1-phosphate phosphatase activity; phosphatase activity
Cellular component	integral component of membrane; Golgi apparatus; membrane; adherens junction; plasma membrane; integral component of plasma membrane
Biological process	phospholipid dephosphorylation; lipid metabolism; canonical Wnt signaling pathway involved in positive regulation of wound healing; canonical Wnt signaling pathway involved in positive regulation of cell-cell adhesion; sphingolipid biosynthetic process; canonical Wnt signaling pathway involved in positive regulation of endothelial cell migration; homotypic cell-cell adhesion; regulation of Wnt signaling pathway; phospholipid metabolic process; germ cell migration; protein dephosphorylation; negative regulation of protein phosphorylation; protein stabilization; positive regulation of DNA-binding transcription factor activity; canonical Wnt signaling pathway
Sources:Amigo / QuickGO
Orthologs
Databases	NCBI: entry; OMA: entry
Species	Human	Mouse
Entrez	8613	67916
Ensembl	ENSG00000162407	ENSMUSG00000028517
UniProt	O14495	Q99JY8
RefSeq (mRNA)	NM_177414; NM_003713	NM_080555
RefSeq (protein)	NP_003704	NP_542122
Location (UCSC)	Chr 1: 56.49 – 56.65 Mb	Chr 4: 105.01 – 105.09 Mb
PubMed search
- Wikidata
View/Edit Human	View/Edit Mouse

Phospholipid phosphatase 3, also called LLP3, is an enzyme that in humans is encoded by the PLPP3 gene (previously PPAP2B). It is ubiquitously expressed in many tissues and cell types. LPP3 is a cell-surface glycoprotein that hydrolyzes extracellular lysophosphatidic acid (LPA) and short-chain phosphatidic acid. Its function allows it to regulate vascular and embryonic development by inhibiting LPA signaling, which is associated with a wide range of human diseases, including cardiovascular disease and cancer, as well as developmental defects. The PPAP2B gene also contains one of 27 loci associated with increased risk of coronary artery disease.

== Structure ==
=== Gene ===
The PPAP2B gene resides on chromosome 1 at the band 1p32.2 and includes 6 exons.

=== Protein ===
LPP3 is a member of the PAP-related phosphoesterase family. It is a type 2 activity PAP, which localizes to the plasma membrane, and is one of four known LPP isoforms. As an integral membrane protein, LPP3 contains six hydrophobic transmembrane domains and a hydrophilic catalytic site composed of three conserved domains. One catalytic domain is proposed to bind the substrate while the other two contribute to dephosphorylation of the substrate. The catalytic site typically faces the extracellular matrix when located on the cell membrane and faces the lumen when located in intracellular membranes. This protein can form homo- and hetero-oligomers.

== Function ==
This protein is a membrane glycoprotein localized at the cell plasma membrane. It has been shown to actively hydrolyze extracellular lysophosphatidic acid (LPA) and short-chain phosphatidic acid. [5] As an LPA inhibitor, PPAP2B is known to suppress LPA receptor mediated cellular signaling, which is associated with activation of vascular and blood cells and epithelial cell migration and proliferation. In response to dynamic atherorelevant-flows, PPAP2B can promote anti-inflammatory phenotype via inhibition of LPA signaling and maintain vascular integrity of endothelial monolayer. This flow-sensitive PPAP2B expression is inhibited by microRNA-92a and activated by transcription factor KLF2. In addition to LPA receptor-mediated signaling, PPAP2B is also associated with Wnt signaling, functioning in embryonic development for proper formation of important tissues including bone, heart and muscle. The phenotype of axis duplication in mice globally lacking PPAP2B resembles that observed in animals with altered Wnt signaling. Furthermore, Wnt signaling mediated TCF/LEF-transcription via β-catenin is upregulated in PPAP2B null embryonic stem cells, implicating LPP3 as a negative regulator of the Wnt pathway.

== Clinical Significance ==
Due to the regulatory role of LPP3 in vascular and embryonic development, inactivation of this protein can contribute to cardiovascular disease and developmental complications. For example, inducible inactivation of LPP3 in both endothelial and hematopoietic cells leads to atherosclerosis due to accumulation of LPA in human plaques. Likewise, plasma LPA levels are significantly elevated in patients with acute coronary syndromes. It was further observed that reduced levels of endothelial LPP3 is associated with disturbed flow and mechano-regulation in blood vessels. During embryonic development in mice, inactivation of LPP3 results in early lethality in part due to failure of extra-embryonic vascular development. Abnormal activation of LPA signaling has also been implicated in cancer, fibrotic disorders, and metabolic syndrome (involving insulin resistance).

=== Clinical Marker ===
In humans, PPAP2B emerged as 1 of 13 new loci associated with coronary artery disease by genome-wide association studies (GWAS). This prediction appears to be independent of traditional risk factors for cardiovascular disease such as high cholesterol levels, high blood pressure, obesity, smoking, and diabetes mellitus.

Additionally, a multi-locus genetic risk score study, based on a combination of 27 loci including the PPAP2B gene, identified individuals at increased risk for both incident and recurrent coronary artery disease events, as well as an enhanced clinical benefit from statin therapy. The study was based on a community cohort study (the Malmo Diet and Cancer study) and four additional randomized controlled trials of primary prevention cohorts (JUPITER and ASCOT) and secondary prevention cohorts (CARE and PROVE IT-TIMI 22).

Taken together, these findings also suggest that PPAP2B and LPA may serve a role in predicting and screening coronary artery disease for early prevention.

== Interactions ==
=== Interactive Pathway Map ===
LPP3 participates in interactions within the triacylglyceride synthesis and sphingolipid metabolism pathways.
