= Hepsin =

HPN
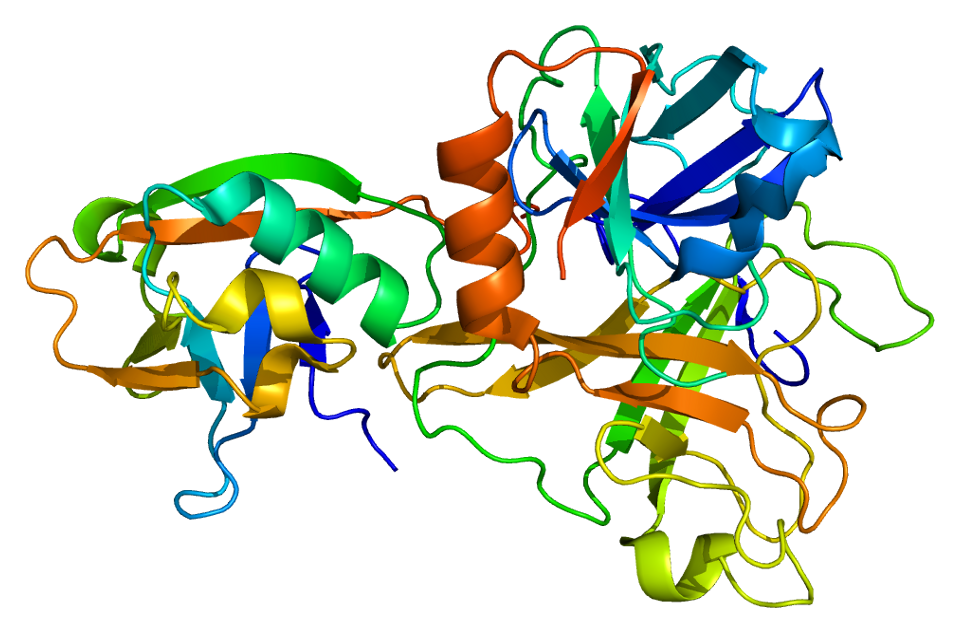

Identifiers
- Aliases: HPN, TMPRSS1, hepsin
- External IDs: OMIM: 142440; MGI: 1196620; GeneCards: HPN
Available structures
PDB	Ortholog search: PDBe RCSB
PDB	List of PDB id codes 1O5E, 1O5F, 1P57, 1Z8G, 3T2N, 5CE1
Enzyme activity
EC #	BRENDA	ExPASy	KEGG	MetaCyc
3.4.21.106	↗	↗	↗	↗

Gene location (Human)
Chr.	Chromosome 19 (human)
Band	19q13.11	Start	35,040,506 bp
Band	19q13.11	End	35,066,573 bp

Gene location (Mouse)
Chr.	Chromosome 7 (mouse)
Band	7|7 B1	Start	30,798,150 bp
Band	7|7 B1	End	30,814,715 bp
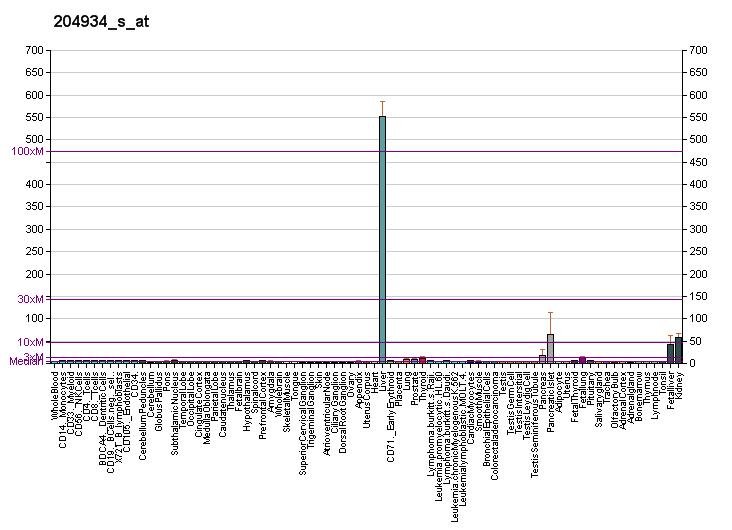
RNA expression pattern
Bgee	Human / Mouse (ortholog); Top expressed in: right lobe of liver; body of pancreas; kidney tubule; body of stomach; gastrocnemius muscle; left lobe of thyroid gland; human kidney; muscle of thigh; right lobe of thyroid gland; pancreatic ductal cell / Top expressed in: right kidney; left lobe of liver; proximal tubule; human kidney; yolk sac; renal pelvis; medullary collecting duct; blastocyst; vestibular sensory epithelium; epithelium of stomach; More reference expression data
BioGPS	More reference expression data
Gene ontology
Molecular function	serine-type exopeptidase activity; calcium-activated potassium channel activity; peptidase activity; protein binding; serine-type peptidase activity; hydrolase activity; serine-type endopeptidase activity
Cellular component	integral component of membrane; nuclear membrane; endoplasmic reticulum membrane; membrane; cell-cell junction; integral component of plasma membrane; cell surface; soma; apical plasma membrane; extracellular exosome; plasma membrane
Biological process	positive regulation of hepatocyte proliferation; positive regulation of plasminogen activation; response to thyroid hormone; negative regulation of apoptotic process; proteolysis; detection of mechanical stimulus involved in sensory perception of sound; positive regulation of thyroid hormone generation; positive regulation of cell growth; positive regulation of gene expression; pilomotor reflex; cochlea morphogenesis; potassium ion transmembrane transport; regulation of cell shape; negative regulation of epithelial cell proliferation; basement membrane disassembly; negative regulation of epithelial to mesenchymal transition; hepatocyte growth factor receptor signaling pathway
Sources:Amigo / QuickGO
Orthologs
Databases	NCBI: entry; OMA: entry
Species	Human	Mouse
Entrez	3249	15451
Ensembl	ENSG00000105707	ENSMUSG00000001249
UniProt	P05981	O35453
RefSeq (mRNA)	NM_002151; NM_182983; NM_001375441; NM_001384133	NM_001110252; NM_001276269; NM_008281
RefSeq (protein)	NP_002142; NP_892028; NP_001362370; NP_001371062	NP_001103722; NP_001263198; NP_032307
Location (UCSC)	Chr 19: 35.04 – 35.07 Mb	Chr 7: 30.8 – 30.81 Mb
PubMed search
- Wikidata
View/Edit Human	View/Edit Mouse

Hepsin

Identifiers
- EC no.: 3.4.21.106
- CAS no.: 112398-23-9

Databases
- BRENDA: enzyme data
- ExPASy: NiceZyme view
- KEGG: enzyme entry
- MetaCyc: metabolic pathway
- Rhea: reactions
- PDB structures: RCSB PDB PDBe PDBsum
Search
- PMC: articles
- PubMed: articles
- NCBI: proteins

Hepsin is an enzyme that in humans is encoded by the HPN gene.

Hepsin is a type II transmembrane serine protease found on the cell surface of various mammalian tissues. In humans, the HPN gene encodes hepsin and is located on chromosome 19. The enzyme belongs to the type II transmembrane serine protease (TTSP) family, a group of membrane-anchored serine proteases that regulate a variety of proteolytic functions at the cell surface. Hepsin is part of the hepsin/TMPRSS subfamily of TTSPs, which contain a scavenger receptor cysteine-rich (SRCR) domain that facilitates interactions with other proteins. These proteases are conserved across vertebrates, highlighting their important roles in tissue stability, development and cellular processes.

Hepsin is found in multiple organs, with the liver, kidney, and prostate showing the highest expression levels. Other tissues, such as the pancreas, lung, and thyroid have shown lower levels of hepsin expression. The enzyme's structure includes a short cytoplasmic tail, a single transmembrane helix, and an extracellular domain that is responsible for its proteolytic function. Hepsin cleaves and activates pro-hepatocyte growth factor (pro-HGF) and coagulation factor VII, suggesting roles in both signaling pathways and the blood clotting process. Higher levels of hepsin expression are linked to various diseases, most notably prostate cancer in humans, where the enzyme can promote metastasis, tumor spread, and disruption of normal tissue structure. Mouse model studies indicate that both over expression and under expression of hepsin can directly affect tumor growth, cell movement, and metastatic behavior. Apart from its role in cancer, hepsin also contributes to kidney protein processing, liver metabolism and auditory function, demonstrating that the enzyme plays important and diverse physiological functions in different tissues.

== Discovery ==
Hepsin was originally discovered in 1988 by Stephen P. Leytus, Kenneth R. Loeb, Frederic S. Hagen, Koiti Kurachi, and Earl W. Davie, who identified it from a human liver cDNA clone. The gene was isolated using sequences targeting the conserved catalytic domain of trypsin-like serine proteases. The enzyme was named "Hepsin" due to its hepatocyte origin. Following the identification of human hepsin, researchers cloned the enzyme from rat liver and mouse tissue as well. In mice, researchers amplified hepsin cDNA from early embryos and isolated the gene from a liver genomic library. The HPN gene, which encodes hepsin, is also known as TMPRSS1, and is located on chromosome 19q13.11. Hepsin belongs to the type II transmembrane serine protease (TTSP) family and is also registered in major protein and gene databases, including UniProt (ID: P05981) and NCBI Gene (ID: 3249).

== Structure ==
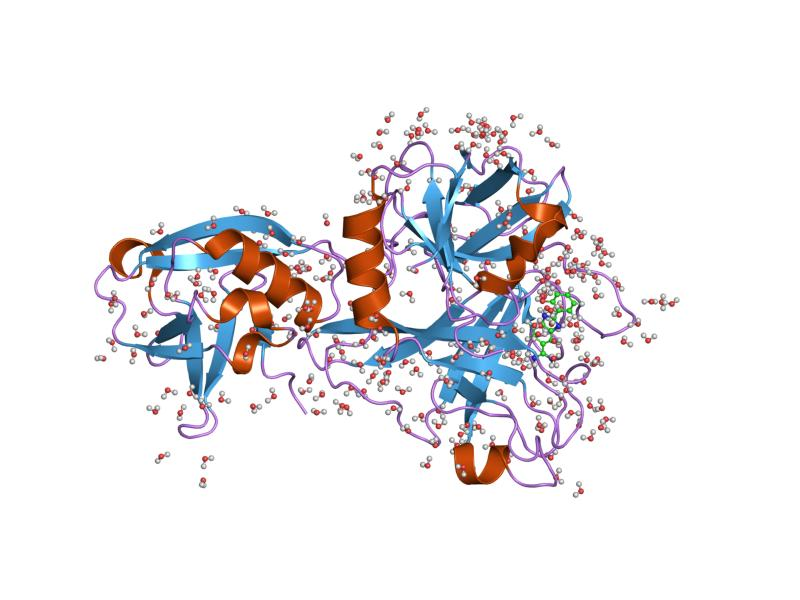
Cartoon representation of the human hepsin (HPN) protein (PDB ID: 1P57). Image courtesy of Jawahar Swaminathan and MSD staff, European Bioinformatics Institute [https://www.ebi.ac.uk/].

Hepsin is a type II transmembrane serine protease made up of a short cytoplasmic region, a single transmembrane helix, and an extracellular region. The N-terminus is located in the cytoplasm, and the C-terminus extends into the extracellular space. The cytoplasmic region is approximately 17 amino acids long. The transmembrane helix extends through the lipid bilayer, securing hepsin at the cell surface and allowing the extracellular region to maintain a stable orientation for substrate interaction and proteolytic activity. The extracellular region contains the enzyme's functional domains and represents the largest structural region of the protein. The portion consists of two domains: a catalytic serine protease domain and a smaller non catalytic domain, known as a scavenger receptor cysteine rich (SRCR) domain. Within the serine protease domain, two β-barrel subdomains form the catalytic site, which include the catalytic triad (His, Asp, Ser) that is essential for protease activity. This domain also features a substrate binding pocket, which influences the enzyme's specificity for substrate selectivity. The SRCR domain, located near the membrane, is linked to the protease domain through a disulfide bond and other non-covalent interactions. While the domain does not participate directly in proteolysis, the SRCR domain is believed to help position the protease domain and facilitate protein to protein interactions.

The SRCR domain is stabilized by three internal disulfide bonds and a compact hydrophobic core, which help maintain its structure. The monomeric protein has a length of 417 amino acids and a molecular weight of approximately 45,011 Daltons.

== Function ==
Hepsin is a type II transmembrane serine protease anchored at the cell surface. The enzyme modifies specific protein substrates, including zymogens, by cleaving them through proteolytic processing. Hepsin plays a major role in converting prohepatocyte growth factor (pro-HGF) into its active form, Hepatocyte growth factor (HGF). Once activated, HGF binds to the Met receptor, triggering multiple signaling pathways that control liver metabolism, including glycogen storage, lipid processing, and protein processing in the liver. Hepsin's enzymatic function occurs by cleaving at Arg162-Ile163, using a catalytic triad (His203, Asp257, and Ser353) for substrate hydrolysis.

Hepsin also contributes to remodeling of the extracellular matrix (ECM). This proteolytic activity promotes cellular interaction with the ECM, supporting tissue organization, structural stability, and cell adhesion. While hepsin is expressed at highest levels in the liver, it is also found in other epithelial tissues, where it contributes to maintaining normal tissue organization. Hepsin is also highly expressed in the kidney, where it plays a role in uromodulin processing. It may additionally activate pro-matrix metalloproteinases, which facilitates the break down of extracellular matrix proteins and release of growth factors that are important for tissue repair and cell movement.

Hepsin's activity at the cell surface depends on correct protein folding and localization of the membrane. A sugar molecule attached at Asn112 within the SRCR domain helps hepsin fold properly and ensures that its transport to the cell membrane is successful. Without this modification, hepsin remains in the endoplasmic reticulum and cannot perform its enzymatic functions. Hepsin is also regulated by natural protein inhibitors like HAI-1 and HAI-2, which limit its proteolytic activity, and calpain-1, which can reduce hepsin's functional levels on the cell surface by cleaving the enzyme directly from the cell membrane.

In the liver, hepsin's conversion of pro-HGF to HGF stimulates Met receptor signaling. As a result, downstream targets such as AKT, mTOR, and GSK3 are activated. These signaling events increase lipid, glycogen, and protein synthesis within hepatocytes. Beyond the liver, hepsin contributes to multiple processes in other tissues, including protein processing in the kidney, organization of the extracellular matrix, development of the inner ear structure and fat cell activity. Within the kidney, hepsin processes uromodulin at a specific site, allowing it to polymerize and be secreted into urine. This process is important for maintaining electrolyte balance and proper function of the urinary tract. Hepsin deficiency disrupts uromodulin processing and reduces polymer levels in urine, which affects kidney function. In adipose tissue, hepsin inhibits the development and activity of brown cells by increasing HGF, which activates Met, and AKT signaling. Through this mechanism, hepsin limits energy use of fat cells and reduces the production of thermogenic proteins, including Ucp1 and Cidea. In the inner ear, hepsin driven HGF activation and Met signaling supports the formation of cochlear structures. This development is critical for normal auditory function and sound perception in mammals.

== Expression and regulation ==
Hepsin is expressed in the liver, where it plays a central role in glucose, lipid, and protein metabolism. The enzyme is also found in multiple non-hepatic tissues, such as adipose tissue, kidney, inner ear, lung, prostate, thyroid, stomach, and breast. In adipose tissue, hepsin affects the development of fat cells and their energy use through specific signaling pathways that control both cell growth and metabolic activity. In the kidney, the enzyme contributes to the proteolytic processing and polymerization of uromodulin in epithelial cells of the thick ascending limb. In the inner ear, hepsin is required for normal auditory function. Research in mice lacking hepsin have shown lower blood glucose and lipid levels, hearing loss, and problems with renal protein processing.

At the cellular level, hepsin is a type II transmembrane serine protease, whose active form is localized on the cell surface. The enzyme's function depends on post-translational changes, including zymogen activation and N-glycosylation in the SRCR domain. Disruption of N-glycosylation causes hepsin to remain the endoplasmic reticulum, not allowing it to become active, showing how important intracellular processing is for its function.

Hepsin activity at the cell surface is also controlled by ectodomain shedding. Calpain-1, a calcium dependent enzyme protease, helps remove hepsin from the membrane, lowering the amount of active enzyme levels. Additional protein inhibitors, such as hepatocyte growth factor inhibitors HAI-1 and HAI-2 and SerpinB12, can also limit hepsin's enzymatic activity. Together, these mechanisms regulate when and where hepsin is active, allowing it to carry out specific functions in different tissues while preventing unwanted protein cleavage. However, the mechanisms that control hepsin expression in different tissues are not fully understood.

== Clinical significance ==
Hepsin has been studied mainly for its role in cancer, where changes in its expression are linked to tumor behavior in multiple tissues. Changes in hepsin activity can affect cellular interactions within their environment, which can contribute to tumor growth or spread. Hepsin is most studied in prostate cancer, but its role in breast, ovarian, and other types of cancers have also been explored.

Hepsin shows strong over expression in prostate cancer, with even higher levels in metastatic tumors, and higher expression being associated with shorter overall and progression-free survival. Analysis of TCGA datasets reveal that hepsin expression is significantly higher in prostate cancer than in normal prostate tissues and is further increased in metastatic tumors. Research has shown that hepsin facilitates cancer cell growth, migration, invasion, and metastasis by disrupting the basement membranes and the extracellular matrix. The enzyme acts through several pathways in prostate cancer. It activates macrophage-stimulating protein (MSP) and pro-urokinase-type plasminogen activator (pro-uPA), which can increase cell movement and help tumors invade surrounding tissues. Additionally, hepsin also activates metalloproteinases, promoting extracellular matrix breakdown and increased cell motility. The enzyme also cleaves laminin-332, an extracellular matrix protein, and inhibits STING, a protein involved in immune signaling. Hepsin has been shown to cooperate with the oncogene MYC and interact with the miR-222/AKT signaling pathway, promoting epithelial-mesenchymal transition and metastasis. Genetic studies indicate that hepsin gene amplification is linked to metastatic prostate cancer. Some single nucleotide polymorphisms and haplotypes of hepsin have been associated to increased risk or aggressiveness of prostate cancer in some patient populations. Preclinical research has shown that hepsin targeting inhibitors and antibodies decrease cancer cell motility and metastasis. Small molecule inhibitors, such as hepsin-13 and neutralizing antibodies have also been shown to reduce metastasis in animal models and cell based-assays.

Beyond its role in prostate cancer, hepsin also plays a significant role in breast cancer. In breast tissue, hepsin can modify the extracellular matrix (ECM) by breaking down ECM-associated proteins, which can release growth factors such as transforming growth factor beta (TGFβ). This activity influences proliferation, tissue organization, and the local signaling environment within breast tumors. In ovarian cancer, hepsin is frequently expressed in epithelial ovarian carcinomas. While normal ovarian tissue shows low levels of hepsin, both low malignant potential tumors and carcinomas show significantly elevated expression of the enzyme. Anchored at the cell surface with its active site facing the extracellular space, hepsin may facilitate tumor growth and invasion by breaking down surrounding extracellular matrix proteins or activating other proteases. This over expression indicates that hepsin could contribute to the invasive capacity and expansion of ovarian tumor cells.

Studies in mouse models have shown that hepsin is required for normal hearing. Mice lacking the hepsin gene show hearing impairments detectable early in life, primarily caused due to structural defects in the tectorial membrane (TM) of the cochlea. Hepsin absence disrupts the organization of the tectorial membrane, producing swelling, gaps, and partial separation from the spiral limbus, which disrupts normal cochlear function. As a result, hepsin knockout mice show elevated auditory thresholds and reduced outer hair cell amplification at high frequencies as revealed by ABR and DPOAE tests. These findings suggest that hepsin contributes to the development and structural integrity of the TM, which is essential for proper cochlear mechanics. Although these findings come from animal models, they indicate that proper hepsin activity during development is important for hearing and inner ear physiology.

== See also ==
- HPN (gene)
