= Biological computing =

Biological molecules for computations

Biological computers use biologically derived molecules — such as DNA and/or proteins — to perform digital or real computations.

The development of biocomputers has been made possible by the expanding new science of nanobiotechnology. The term nanobiotechnology can be defined in multiple ways; in a more general sense, as any type of technology that uses both nano-scale materials (i.e. materials having characteristic dimensions of 1-100 nanometers) and biologically based materials. A more restrictive definition views nanobiotechnology more specifically as the design and engineering of proteins that can then be assembled into larger, functional structures The implementation of nanobiotechnology, as defined in this narrower sense, provides scientists with the ability to engineer biomolecular systems specifically so that they interact in a fashion that can ultimately result in the computational functionality of a computer.

== Scientific background ==
Biocomputers use biologically derived materials to perform computational functions. A biocomputer consists of a pathway or series of metabolic pathways involving biological materials that are engineered to behave in a certain manner based upon the conditions (input) of the system. The resulting pathway of reactions that takes place constitutes an output, which is based on the engineering design of the biocomputer and can be interpreted as a form of computational analysis. Three distinguishable types of biocomputers include biochemical computers, biomechanical computers, and bioelectronic computers.

=== Biochemical computers ===
Biochemical computers use the immense variety of feedback loops that are characteristic of biological chemical reactions in order to achieve computational functionality. Feedback loops in biological systems take many forms, and many different factors can provide both positive and negative feedback to a particular biochemical process, causing either an increase in chemical output or a decrease in chemical output, respectively. Such factors may include the quantity of catalytic enzymes present, the amount of reactants present, the amount of products present, and the presence of molecules that bind to and thus alter the chemical reactivity of any of the aforementioned factors. Given the nature of these biochemical systems to be regulated through many different mechanisms, one can engineer a chemical pathway comprising a set of molecular components that react to produce one particular product under one set of specific chemical conditions and another particular product under another set of conditions. The presence of the particular product that results from the pathway can serve as a signal, which can be interpreted—along with other chemical signals—as a computational output based upon the starting chemical conditions of the system (the input).

=== Biomechanical computers ===
Biomechanical computers are similar to biochemical computers in that they both perform a specific operation that can be interpreted as a functional computation based upon specific initial conditions which serve as input. They differ, however, in what exactly serves as the output signal. In biochemical computers, the presence or concentration of certain chemicals serves as the output signal. In biomechanical computers, however, the mechanical shape of a specific molecule or set of molecules under a set of initial conditions serves as the output. Biomechanical computers rely on the nature of specific molecules to adopt certain physical configurations under certain chemical conditions. The mechanical, three-dimensional structure of the product of the biomechanical computer is detected and interpreted appropriately as a calculated output.

=== Bioelectronic computers ===
Biocomputers can also be constructed in order to perform electronic computing. Again, like both biomechanical and biochemical computers, computations are performed by interpreting a specific output that is based upon an initial set of conditions that serve as input. In bioelectronic computers, the measured output is the nature of the electrical conductivity that is observed in the bioelectronic computer. This output comprises specifically designed biomolecules that conduct electricity in highly specific manners based upon the initial conditions that serve as the input of the bioelectronic system.

=== Network-based biocomputers ===
In networks-based biocomputation, self-propelled biological agents, such as molecular motor proteins or bacteria, explore a microscopic network that encodes a mathematical problem of interest. The paths of the agents through the network and/or their final positions represent potential solutions to the problem. For instance, in the system described by Nicolau et al., mobile molecular motor filaments are detected at the "exits" of a network encoding the NP-complete problem SUBSET SUM. All exits visited by filaments represent correct solutions to the algorithm. Exits not visited are non-solutions. The motility proteins are either actin and myosin or kinesin and microtubules. The myosin and kinesin, respectively, are attached to the bottom of the network channels. When adenosine triphosphate (ATP) is added, the actin filaments or microtubules are propelled through the channels, thus exploring the network. The energy conversion from chemical energy (ATP) to mechanical energy (motility) is highly efficient when compared with e.g. electronic computing, so the computer, in addition to being massively parallel, also uses orders of magnitude less energy per computational step.

== Engineering biocomputers ==
A ribosome is a biological machine that uses protein dynamics on nanoscales to translate RNA into proteins.

The behavior of biologically derived computational systems such as these relies on the particular molecules that make up the system, which are primarily proteins but may also include DNA molecules. Nanobiotechnology provides the means to synthesize the multiple chemical components necessary to create such a system. The chemical nature of a protein is dictated by its sequence of amino acids—the chemical building blocks of proteins. This sequence is in turn dictated by a specific sequence of DNA nucleotides—the building blocks of DNA molecules. Proteins are manufactured in biological systems through the translation of nucleotide sequences by biological molecules called ribosomes, which assemble individual amino acids into polypeptides that form functional proteins based on the nucleotide sequence that the ribosome interprets. What this ultimately means is that one can engineer the chemical components necessary to create a biological system capable of performing computations by engineering DNA nucleotide sequences to encode for the necessary protein components. Also, the synthetically designed DNA molecules themselves may function in a particular biocomputer system. Thus, implementing nanobiotechnology to design and produce synthetically designed proteins—as well as the design and synthesis of artificial DNA molecules—can allow the construction of functional biocomputers (e.g. Computational Genes).

Biocomputers can also be designed with cells as their basic components. Chemically induced dimerization systems can be used to make logic gates from individual cells. These logic gates are activated by chemical agents that induce interactions between previously non-interacting proteins and trigger some observable change in the cell.

Network-based biocomputers are engineered by nanofabrication of the hardware from wafers where the channels are etched by electron-beam lithography or nano-imprint lithography. The channels are designed to have a high aspect ratio of cross section so the protein filaments will be guided. Also, split and pass junctions are engineered so filaments will propagate in the network and explore the allowed paths. Surface silanization ensures that the motility proteins can be affixed to the surface and remain functional. The molecules that perform the logic operations are derived from biological tissue.

== Economics ==
All biological organisms have the ability to self-replicate and self-assemble into functional components. The economical benefit of biocomputers lies in this potential of all biologically derived systems to self-replicate and self-assemble given appropriate conditions. For instance, all of the necessary proteins for a certain biochemical pathway, which could be modified to serve as a biocomputer, could be synthesized many times over inside a biological cell from a single DNA molecule. This DNA molecule could then be replicated many times over. This characteristic of biological molecules could make their production highly efficient and relatively inexpensive. Whereas electronic computers require manual production, biocomputers could be produced in large quantities from cultures without any additional machinery needed to assemble them.

== Notable advancements in biocomputer technology ==
Currently, biocomputers exist with various functional capabilities that include operations of Boolean logic and mathematical calculations. Tom Knight of the MIT Artificial Intelligence Laboratory first suggested a biochemical computing scheme in which protein concentrations are used as binary signals that ultimately serve to perform logical operations. At or above a certain concentration of a particular biochemical product in a biocomputer chemical pathway indicates a signal that is either a 1 or a 0. A concentration below this level indicates the other, remaining signal. Using this method as computational analysis, biochemical computers can perform logical operations in which the appropriate binary output will occur only under specific logical constraints on the initial conditions. In other words, the appropriate binary output serves as a logically derived conclusion from a set of initial conditions that serve as premises from which the logical conclusion can be made. In addition to these types of logical operations, biocomputers have also been shown to demonstrate other functional capabilities, such as mathematical computations. One such example was provided by W.L. Ditto, who in 1999 created a biocomputer composed of leech neurons at Georgia Tech which was capable of performing simple addition. These are just a few of the notable uses that biocomputers have already been engineered to perform, and the capabilities of biocomputers are becoming increasingly sophisticated. Because of the availability and potential economic efficiency associated with producing biomolecules and biocomputers—as noted above—the advancement of the technology of biocomputers is a popular, rapidly growing subject of research that is likely to see much progress in the future.

In March 2013, a team of bioengineers from Stanford University, led by Drew Endy, announced that they had created the biological equivalent of a transistor, which they dubbed a "transcriptor". The invention was the final of the three components necessary to build a fully functional computer: data storage, information transmission, and a basic system of logic.

Parallel biological computing with networks, where bio-agent movement corresponds to arithmetical addition was demonstrated in 2016 on a SUBSET SUM instance with 8 candidate solutions.

In July 2017, separate experiments with E. Coli published on Nature showed the potential of using living cells for computing tasks and storing information. A team formed with collaborators of the Biodesign Institute at Arizona State University and Harvard's Wyss Institute for Biologically Inspired Engineering developed a biological computer inside E. Coli that responded to a dozen inputs. The team called the computer "ribocomputer", as it was composed of ribonucleic acid. Harvard researchers proved that it is possible to store information in bacteria after successfully archiving images and movies in the DNA of living E. coli cells.

In 2021, a team led by biophysicist Sangram Bagh realized a study with E. coli to solve 2 x 2 maze problems to probe the principle for distributed computing among cells.

In 2024, FinalSpark, a Swiss biocomputing startup, launched an online platform enabling global researchers to conduct experiments remotely on biological neurons in vitro.

In March 2025, Cortical Labs revealed the CL1, world’s first commercial biological computer.Made up of roughly 800,000 lab-grown human neurons grown on a silicon chip, code can be directly deployed to the neurons using the company's Biological Intelligence Operating System ("biOS"). The neurons can be kept alive for 6 months. Cortical labs hopes the technology can be used in the medical field as well as compete with traditional AI systems.

The Biological Computing Company (TBC) is a biological computing company headquartered in San Francisco. TBC emerged from stealth in February 2026. TBC uses living neurons to increase the efficiency of AI models, helping reduce inference cost and enhance coherent output. The company uses a biological approach, developing software that applies computational principles observed in cultured neuronal networks to AI models.

== Future potential of biocomputers ==
Many examples of simple biocomputers have been designed, but the capabilities of these biocomputers are very limited in comparison to commercially available inorganic computers.

The potential to solve complex mathematical problems using far less energy than standard electronic supercomputers, as well as to perform more reliable calculations simultaneously rather than sequentially, motivates the further development of "scalable" biological computers, and several funding agencies are supporting these efforts.

== See also ==
- Biotechnology
- Computational gene
- Computer
- DNA computing
- Human biocomputer
- Molecular electronics
- Nanotechnology
- Nanobiotechnology
- Organoid intelligence
- Peptide computing
- Wetware computer
- Unconventional computing
