= Timeline of biotechnology =

The historical application of biotechnology throughout time is provided below in chronological order.

These discoveries, inventions and modifications are evidence of the application of biotechnology since before the common era and describe notable events in the research, development and regulation of biotechnology.

== Before Common Era ==
- 7000 BCE – Beermaking is discovered in the land-circle of Kulmbach
- 6000 BCE – Yogurt and cheese made with lactic acid-producing bacteria by various people.
- 5000 BCE – Chinese discover fermentation through beer making.
- 4500 BCE – Egyptians bake leavened bread using yeast.
- 500 BCE – Moldy soybean curds used as an antibiotic.
- 300 BCE – The Greeks practice crop rotation for maximum soil fertility.
- 100 AD – Chinese use chrysanthemum as a natural insecticide.

== Pre-20th century ==
- 1663 – First recorded description of living cells by Robert Hooke.
- 1677 – Antonie van Leeuwenhoek discovers and describes bacteria and protozoa.
- 1798 – Edward Jenner uses first viral vaccine to inoculate a child from smallpox.
- 1802 – The first recorded use of the word biology.
- 1824 – Henri Dutrochet discovers that tissues are composed of living cells.
- 1838 – Protein discovered, named and recorded by Gerardus Johannes Mulder and Jöns Jacob Berzelius.
- 1862 – Louis Pasteur discovers the bacterial origin of fermentation.
- 1863 – Gregor Mendel discovers the laws of inheritance.
- 1864 – Antonin Prandtl invents first centrifuge to separate cream from milk.
- 1869 – Friedrich Miescher identifies DNA in the sperm of a trout.
- 1871 – Felix Hoppe-Seyler discovers invertase, which is still used for making artificial sweeteners.
- 1877 – Robert Koch develops a technique for staining bacteria for identification.
- 1878 – Walther Flemming discovers chromatin leading to the discovery of chromosomes.
- 1881 – Louis Pasteur develops vaccines against bacteria that cause cholera and anthrax in chickens.
- 1885 – Louis Pasteur and Emile Roux develop the first rabies vaccine and use it on Joseph Meister.

== 20th century ==
- 1919 – Károly Ereky, a Hungarian agricultural engineer, first uses the word biotechnology.
- In 1919, a pivotal milestone was reached with the production of citric acid by Aspergillus niger, marking the inception of the first aerobic fermentation process. This breakthrough spurred the development of technologies to ensure the supply of sterile air at a large scale, paving the way for future advancements in industrial fermentation processes.
- 1928 – Alexander Fleming notices that a certain mold could stop the duplication of bacteria, leading to the first antibiotic: penicillin.
- 1933 – Hybrid corn is commercialized.
- 1942 – Penicillin is mass-produced in microbes for the first time.
- 1950 – The first synthetic antibiotic is created.
- 1951 – Artificial insemination of livestock is accomplished using frozen semen.
- 1952 – L.V. Radushkevich and V.M. Lukyanovich publish clear images of 50 nanometer diameter tubes made of carbon, in the Soviet Journal of Physical Chemistry.
- 1953 – James D. Watson and Francis Crick describe the structure of DNA.
- 1958 – The term bionics is coined by Jack E. Steele.
- 1964 – The first commercial myoelectric arm is developed by the Central Prosthetic Research Institute of the USSR and distributed by the Hangar Limb Factory of the UK.
- 1972 – The DNA composition of chimpanzees and gorillas is discovered to be 99% similar to that of humans.
- 1973 – Stanley Norman Cohen and Herbert Boyer perform the first successful recombinant DNA experiment, using bacterial genes.
- 1974 – Scientists invent the first biocement for industrial applications.
- 1975 – Method for producing monoclonal antibodies developed by Köhler and César Milstein.
- 1977 – Frederick Sanger publishes the first method for sequencing DNA allowing for the analysis of specific nucleotide sequences.
- 1978 – North Carolina scientists Clyde Hutchison and Marshall Edgell show it is possible to introduce specific mutations at specific sites in a DNA molecule.
- 1980 – The U.S. patent for gene cloning is awarded to Cohen and Boyer.
- 1982 – Humulin, Genentech's human insulin drug produced by genetically engineered bacteria for the treatment of diabetes, is the first biotech drug to be approved by the Food and Drug Administration.
- 1983 – The Polymerase Chain Reaction (PCR) technique is conceived.
- 1990 – First federally approved gene therapy treatment is performed successfully on a young girl who suffered from an immune disorder.
- 1994 – The United States Food and Drug Administration approves the first GM food: the "Flavr Savr" tomato.
- 1997 – British scientists, led by Ian Wilmut from the Roslin Institute, report cloning Dolly the sheep using DNA from two adult sheep cells.
- 1999 – Discovery of the gene responsible for developing cystic fibrosis.
- 2000 – Completion of a "rough draft" of the human genome in the Human Genome Project.

== 21st century ==
- 2001 – Celera Genomics and the Human Genome Project create a draft of the human genome sequence. It is published by Science and Nature Magazine.
- 2002 – Rice becomes the first crop to have its genome decoded.
- 2003 – The Human Genome Project is completed, providing information on the locations and sequence of human genes on all 46 chromosomes.
- 2004 – Addgene launches.
- 2008 – Japanese astronomers launch the first Medical Experiment Module called "Kibō", to be used on the International Space Station.
- 2010-Over the past two decades, a considerable focus has been directed toward creating sustainable alternatives for petroleum-based fuels, chemicals, and materials. Major players in the chemical industry, such as BASF, DSM, BP, and Total, have initiated significant projects and collaborations in metabolic engineering. Additionally, various startups have emerged with the goal of pioneering new bio-based processes for sustainable chemicals. Despite advancements in establishing large-scale processes, the overall impact on transitioning the chemical industry from petroleum-based to bio-based has been limited. For instance, efforts to engineer microbial production of succinic acid have faced challenges, leading to the termination or minimal-scale production of related research and commercial activities. Out of the chemicals listed by the US Department of Energy, only lactic acid and itaconic acid have achieved industrial-scale production. Lactic acid, added to the list in 2010 after large-scale production was established, currently holds a market value exceeding US$2.5 billion, primarily used in the production of polylactate.
- 2009 – Cedars-Sinai Heart Institute uses modified SAN heart genes to create the first viral pacemaker in guinea pigs, now known as iSANs.
- 2012 – Thirty-one-year-old Zac Vawter successfully uses a nervous system-controlled bionic leg to climb the Chicago Willis Tower.
- 2018-The Joint Centre of Excellence by Imperial College and the UK National Physical Laboratory focuses on advancing industry collaboration to transform high-value manufacturing into high-value products. Noteworthy progress includes the adoption of SBOL by ACS Synthetic Biology in 2016 and ongoing efforts, such as engagement with the BioRoboost project, aiming for international standards with partners from the US, China, Japan, and Singapore.
- 2019 – Scientists report, for the first time, the use of the CRISPR technology to edit human genes to treat cancer patients with whom standard treatments were not successful.
- The progression of commercial applications in synthetic biology is notably swift, propelled predominantly by investments directed towards start-up enterprises and small to medium-sized enterprises (SMEs) engaged in the dissemination of tools, services, and products to the market. This is exemplified by the informational resource titled 'Synthetic Biology UK — A Decade of Rapid Progress,' disseminated online in July 2019, which furnishes a demonstrative compilation of instances rooted in the United Kingdom.
- 2019 – In a study researchers describe a new method of genetic engineering superior to previous methods like CRISPR they call "prime editing".

=== 2020 ===
- 27 January – Scientists demonstrate a "Trojan horse" designer-nanoparticle that makes blood cells eat away – from the inside out – portions of atherosclerotic plaque that cause heart attacks and are the current most common cause of death globally.
- 5 February – Scientists develop a CRISPR-Cas12a-based gene editing system that can probe and control several genes at once and can implement logic gating to e.g. detect cancer cells and execute therapeutic immunomodulatory responses.
- 6 February – Scientists report that preliminary results from a phase I trial using CRISPR-Cas9 gene editing of T cells in patients with refractory cancer demonstrates that, according to their study, such CRISPR-based therapies can be safe and feasible.
- 4 March – Scientists report that they have developed a way to 3D bioprint graphene oxide with a protein. They demonstrate that this novel bioink can be used to recreate vascular-like structures. This may be used in the development of safer and more efficient drugs.
- 4 March – Scientists report to have used CRISPR-Cas9 gene editing inside a human's body for the first time. Falsely. They aim to restore vision for a patient with inherited Leber congenital amaurosis and state that it may take up to a month to see whether the procedure was successful. In an hour-long surgery study approved by government regulators doctors inject three drops of fluid containing viruses under the patient's retina. In earlier tests in human tissue, mice and monkeys scientists were able to correct half of the cells with the disease-causing mutation, which was more than what is needed to restore vision. Unlike germline editing these DNA modifications aren't inheritable.
- 9 March – Scientists show that CRISPR-Cas12b is a third promising CRISPR editing tool, next to Cas9 and Cas12a, for plant genome engineering.
- 14 March – Scientists report in a preprint to have developed a CRISPR-based strategy, called PAC-MAN (Prophylactic Antiviral Crispr in huMAN cells), that can find and destroy viruses in vitro. However, they weren't able to test PAC-MAN on the actual SARS-CoV-2, use a targeting-mechanism that uses only a very limited RNA-region, haven't developed a system to deliver it into human cells and would need a lot of time until another version of it or a potential successor system might pass clinical trials. In the study published as a preprint they write that the CRISPR-Cas13d-based system could be used prophylactically as well as therapeutically and that it could be implemented rapidly to manage new pandemic coronavirus strains – and potentially any virus – as it could be tailored to other RNA-targets quickly, only requiring a small change. The paper was published on 29 April 2020.
- 16 March – Researchers report that they have developed a new kind of CRISPR-Cas13d screening platform for effective guide RNA design to target RNA. They used their model to predict optimized Cas13 guide RNAs for all protein-coding RNA-transcripts of the human genome's DNA. Their technology could be used in molecular biology and in medical applications such as for better targeting of virus RNA or human RNA. Targeting human RNA after it has been transcribed from DNA, rather than DNA, would allow for more temporary effects than permanent changes to human genomes. The technology is made available to researchers through an interactive website and free and open source software and is accompanied by a guide on how to create guide RNAs to target the SARS-CoV-2 RNA genome.
- 16 March – Scientists present new multiplexed CRISPR technology, called CHyMErA (Cas Hybrid for Multiplexed Editing and Screening Applications), that can be used to analyse which or how genes act together by simultaneously removing multiple genes or gene-fragments using both Cas9 and Cas12a.
- 10 April – Scientists report to have achieved wireless control of adrenal hormone secretion in genetically unmodified rats through the use of injectable, magnetic nanoparticles (MNPs) and remotely applied alternating magnetic fields heats them up. Their findings may aid research of physiological and psychological impacts of stress and related treatments and present an alternative strategy for modulating peripheral organ function than problematic implantable devices.
- 14 April – Researchers report to have developed a predictive algorithm which can show in visualizations how combinations of genetic mutations can make proteins highly effective or ineffective in organisms – including for viral evolution for viruses like SARS-CoV-2.
- 15 April – Scientists describe and visualize the atomical structure and mechanical action of the bacteria-killing bacteriocin R2 pyocin and construct engineered versions with different behaviours than the naturally occurring version. Their findings may aid the engineering of nanomachines such as for targeted antibiotics.
- 20 April – Researchers demonstrate a diffusive memristor fabricated from protein nanowires of the bacterium Geobacter sulfurreducens which functions at substantially lower voltages than previously described ones and may allow the construction of artificial neurons which function at voltages of biological action potentials. The nanowires have a range of advantages over silicon nanowires and the memristors may be used to directly process biosensing signals, for neuromorphic computing and/or direct communication with biological neurons.
- 27 April – Scientists report to have genetically engineered plants to glow much brighter than previously possible by inserting genes of the bioluminescent mushroom Neonothopanus nambi. The glow is self-sustained, works by converting plants' caffeic acid into luciferin and, unlike for bacterial bioluminescence genes used earlier, has a high light output that is visible to the naked eye.
- 8 May – Researchers report to have developed artificial chloroplasts – the photosynthetic structures inside plant cells. They combined thylakoids, which are used for photosynthesis, from spinach with a bacterial enzyme and an artificial metabolic module of 16 enzymes, which can convert carbon dioxide more efficiently than plants can alone, into cell-sized droplets. According to the study this demonstrates how natural and synthetic biological modules can be matched for new functional systems.
- 11 May – Researchers report the development of synthetic red blood cells that for the first time have all of the natural cells' known broad natural properties and abilities. Furthermore, methods to load functional cargos such as hemoglobin, drugs, magnetic nanoparticles, and ATP biosensors may enable additional non-native functionalities.
- 12 June – Scientists announce preliminary results that demonstrate successful treatment during a small trial of the first to use of CRISPR gene editing (CRISPR-Cas9) to treat inherited genetic disorders – beta thalassaemia and sickle cell disease.
- 8 July – Mitochondria are gene-edited for the first time, using a new kind of CRISPR-free base editor (DdCBE), by a team of researchers.

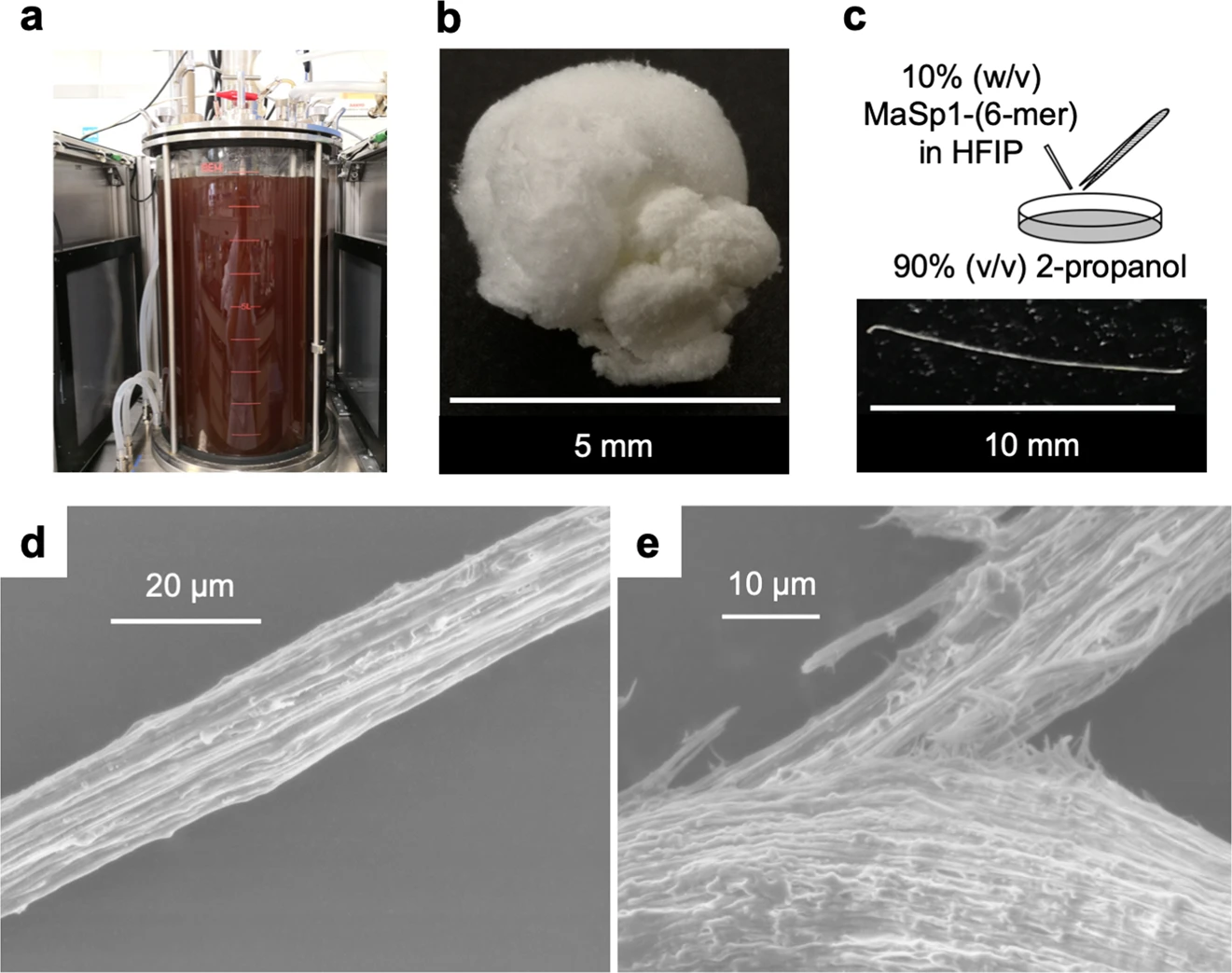
8 July: Researchers report that they succeeded in using a genetically altered variant of R. sulfidophilum to produce spidroins, the main proteins in spider silk.

- 8 July – A team of RIKΞN researchers report that they succeeded in using a genetically altered variant of R. sulfidophilum to produce spidroins, the main proteins in spider silk.
- 10 July – Scientists report that after mice exercise their livers secrete the protein GPLD1, which is also elevated in elderly humans who exercise regularly, that this is associated with improved cognitive function in aged mice and that increasing the amount of GPLD1 produced by the mouse liver could yield many benefits of regular exercise for the brain.
- 17 July – Scientists report that yeast cells of the same genetic material and within the same environment age in two distinct ways, describe a biomolecular mechanism that can determine which process dominates during aging and genetically engineer a novel aging route with substantially extended lifespan.
- 24 July – Scientists report the development of a ML-based process using genome databases for designing novel proteins. They used inverse statistical physics to learn the patterns of amino acid conservation and co-evolution to identify design-rules.
- 8 September – Scientists report that suppressing activin type 2 receptors-signalling proteins myostatin and activin A via activin A/myostatin inhibitor ACVR2B – tested preliminarily in humans in the form of ACE-031 in the 2010s – can protect against both muscle and bone loss in mice. The mice were sent to the International Space Station and could largely maintain their muscle weights – about twice those of wild type due to genetic engineering for targeted deletion of the myostatin gene – under microgravity.
- 18 September – Researchers report the development of two active guide RNA-only elements that, according to their study, may enable halting or deleting gene drives introduced into populations in the wild with CRISPR-Cas9 gene editing. The paper's senior author cautions that the two neutralizing systems they demonstrated in cage trials "should not be used with a false sense of security for field-implemented gene drives".
- 28 September – Biotechnologists report the genetically engineered refinement and mechanical description of synergistic enzymes – PETase, first discovered in 2016, and MHETase of Ideonella sakaiensis – for faster depolymerization of PET and also of PEF, which may be useful for depollution, recycling and upcycling of mixed plastics along with other approaches.
- 7 October – The 2020 Nobel Prize in Chemistry is awarded to Emmanuelle Charpentier and Jennifer A. Doudna for their work on genome editing.

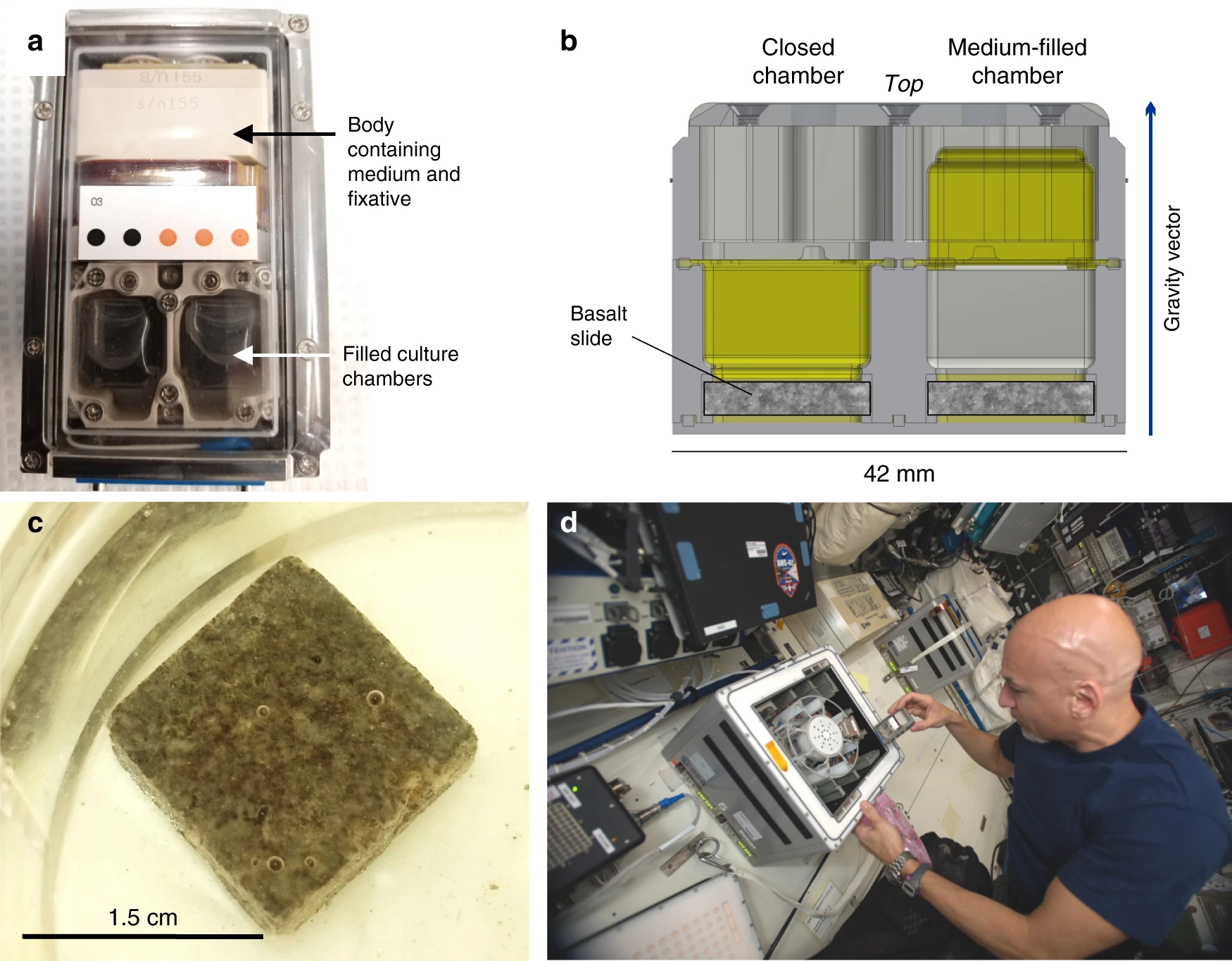
10 November: Scientists show that microorganisms could be employed to mine useful elements from basalt rocks in space.

- 10 November – Scientists show, with an experiment with different gravity environments on the ISS, that microorganisms could be employed to mine useful elements from basalt rocks via bioleaching in space.
- 18 November – Researchers report that CRISPR/Cas9, using a lipid nanoparticle delivery system, has been used to treat cancer effectively in a living animal for the first time.

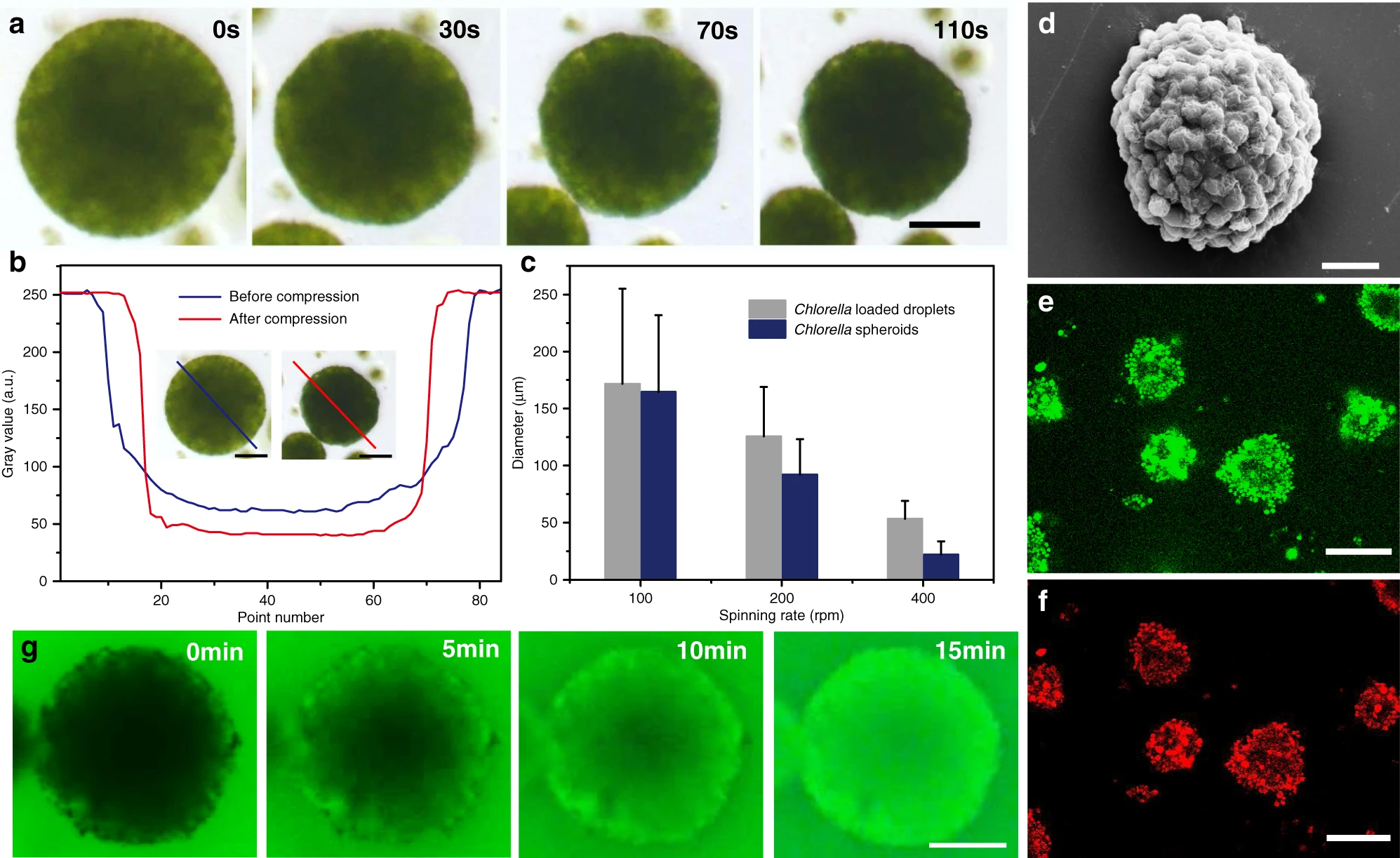
25 November: The development of a biotechnology for microbial reactors capable of producing oxygen as well as hydrogen is reported.

- 25 November – Scientists report the development of micro-droplets for algal cells or synergistic algal-bacterial multicellular spheroid microbial reactors capable of producing oxygen as well as hydrogen via photosynthesis in daylight under air, which may be useful as a hydrogen economy biotechnology.

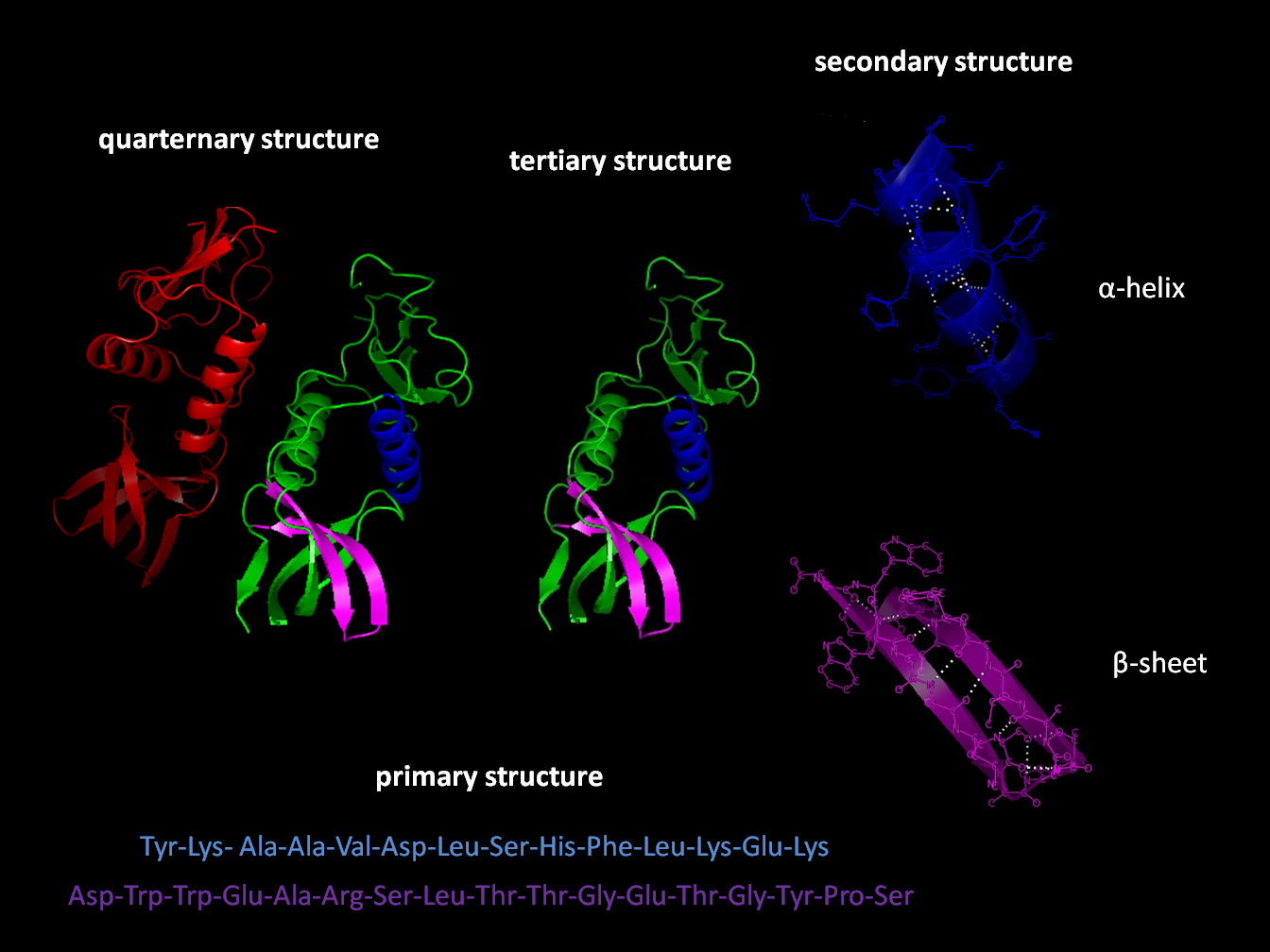
30 November: The 50-year problem of protein structure prediction is reported to be largely solved with an AI algorithm.

- 30 November – An artificial intelligence company demonstrates an AI algorithm-based approach for protein folding, one of the biggest problems in biology that achieves a protein structure prediction accuracy of over 90% in tests of the biennial CASP assessment with AlphaFold 2.
- 2 December – The world's first regulatory approval for a cultivated meat product is awarded by the Government of Singapore. The chicken meat was grown in a bioreactor in a fluid of amino acids, sugar, and salt. The chicken nuggets food products are ~70% lab-grown meat, while the remainder is made from mung bean proteins and other ingredients. The company pledged to strive for price parity with premium "restaurant" chicken servings.
- 11 December – Scientists report that they have rebuilt a human thymus using stem cells and a bioengineered scaffold.

=== 2021 ===
- Scientists report the use of CRISPR/Cas9 genome editing to produce a tenfold increase in super-bug targeting formicamycin antibiotics.
- Scientists use novel lipid nanoparticles to deliver CRISPR genome editing into the livers of mice, resulting in a 57% reduction of LDL cholesterol levels.
- Researchers describe a CRISPR-dCas9 epigenome editing method for a potential treatment of chronic pain, an analgesia that represses Na_{v}1.7 and showed therapeutic potential in three mouse models of pain.
- Scientists report the discovery of unknown species of bacteria of Methylobacterium, tentatively named Methylobacterium ajmalii, associated with three new strains, designated IF7SW-B2T, IIF1SW-B5, and IIF4SW-B5, on the ISS. These potentially have ecological significance in closed microgravity systems.
- A study finds that, despite suboptimal implementation, the snapshot mass-testing for COVID-19 of ~80% of Slovakia's population at the end of October 2020 was highly efficacious, decreasing observed prevalence by 58% within one week and 70% compared to a hypothetical scenario of no snapshot-mass-testing.
- The extensive worldwide pollution risks due to the use of pesticides are estimated with a new environmental model.
- Scientists present a tool for epigenome editing, CRISPRoff, that can heritably silence the gene expression of "most genes" and allows for reversible modifications.
- Scientists report the, controversial, first creation of human-monkey hybrid embryos – some survived for 19 days.
- A malaria vaccine with 77% efficacy after 1 year – and first to meet the WHO's goal of 75% efficacy – is reported by the University of Oxford.
- CRISPR gene editing is demonstrated to decrease LDL cholesterol in vivo in Macaca fascicularis by 60%.
- Researchers partially restore eyesight of a patient with Retinitis pigmentosa using eye-injected viral vectors for genes encoding the light-sensing channelrhodopsin protein ChrimsonR found in glowing algae, and light stimulation of them via engineered goggles that transform visual information of the environment.
- Scientists develop a light-responsive days-lasting modulator of circadian rhythms of tissues via Ck1 inhibition which may be useful for chronobiology research and repair of organs that are "out of sync".
- Biologists report the development of a new updated classification system for cell nuclei and find a way of transmuting one cell type into that of another.

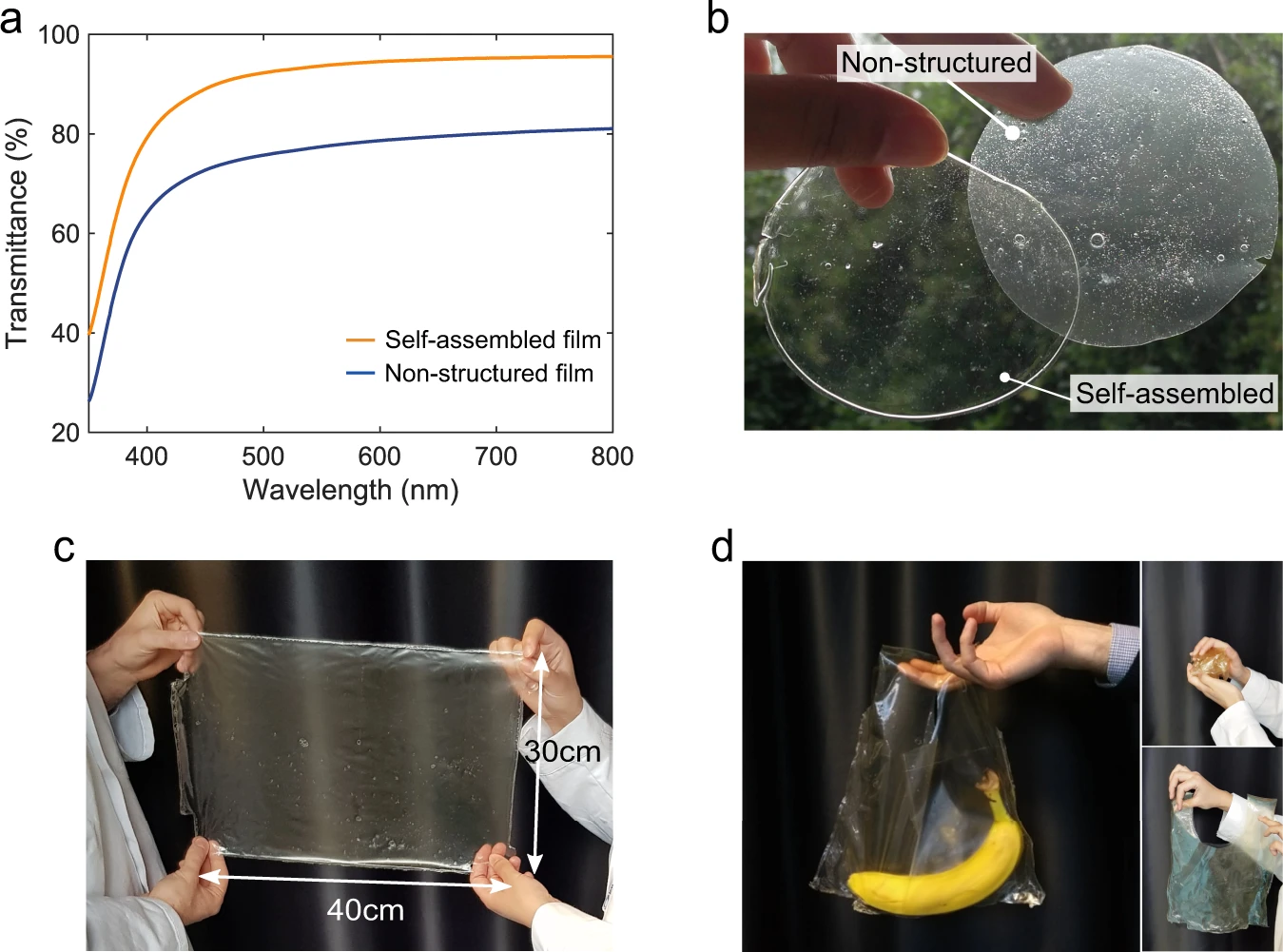

- Researchers report the development of a plant proteins-based biodegradable packaging alternative to plastic based on research about molecularly similar spider silk known for its high strength.
- The first, small clinical trial of CRISPR gene editing in which a – lipid nanoparticle formulated – CRISPR (with mCas9) gene editing therapeutic is injected in vivo into bloodstream of humans concludes with promising results.
- Researchers report the development of embedded biosensors for pathogenic signatures – such as of SARS-CoV-2 – that are wearable such as face masks.
- Scientists report that solar-energy-driven production of microbial foods from direct air capture substantially outperforms agricultural cultivation of staple crops in terms of land use.
- Researchers report that a mix of microorganisms from cow stomachs could break down three types of plastics.
- Researchers report promising results of ongoing testing and development of an engineered monoclonal antibodies based female contraception.
- Researchers demonstrate that probiotics can help coral reefs mitigate heat stress, indicating that such could make them more resilient to climate change and mitigate coral bleaching.

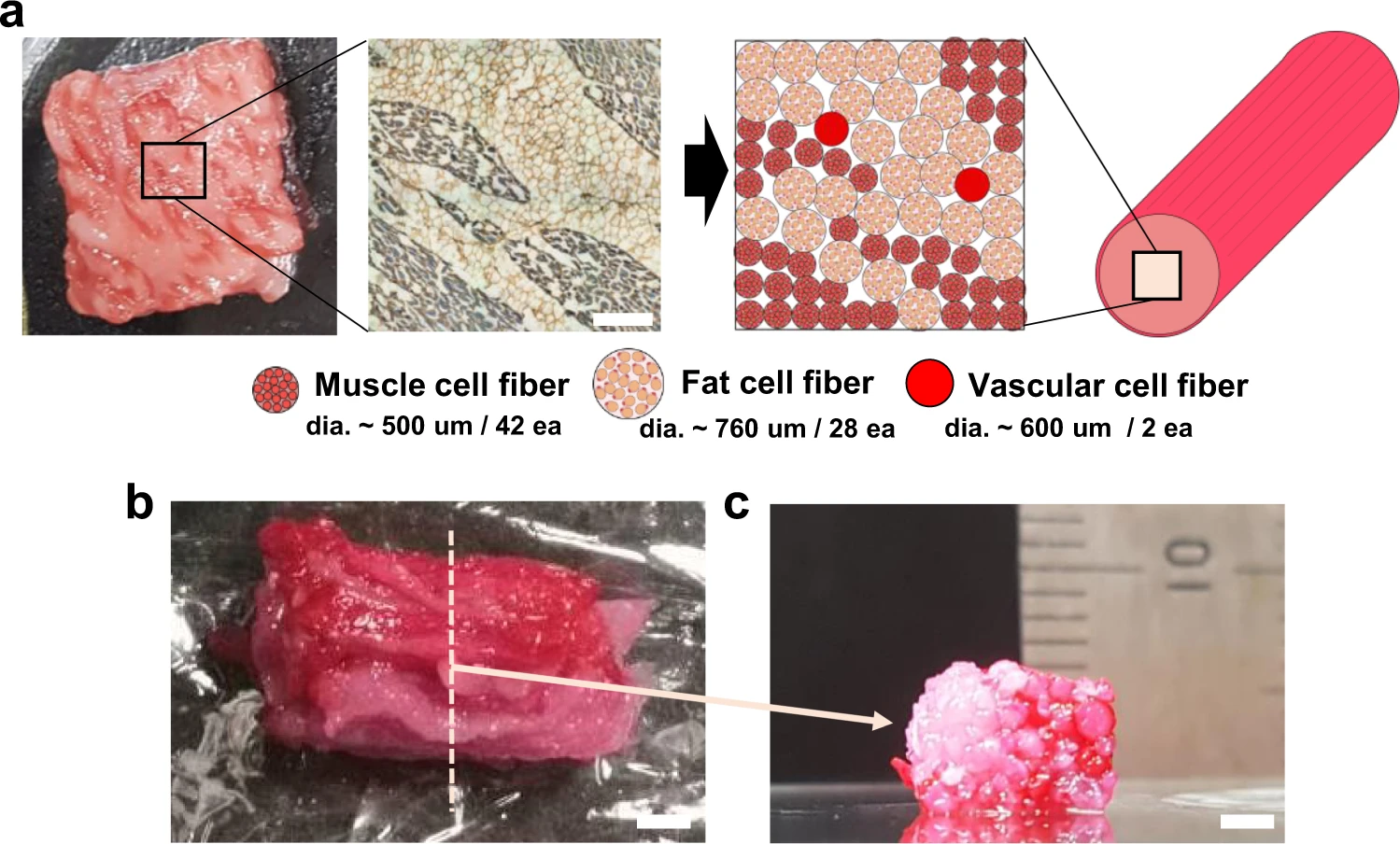
Researchers present a bioprinting method to produce steak-like cultured meat.

- Researchers present a bioprinting method to produce steak-like cultured meat, composed of three types of bovine cell fibers.
- Bioengineers report the development of a viable CRISPR-Cas gene-editing system, "CasMINI", that is about twice as compact as the commonly used Cas9 and Cas12a.
- Media outlets report that the world's first cultured coffee product has been created, still awaiting regulatory approval for near-term commercialization. It was also reported that another biotechnology company produced and sold "molecular coffee" without clear details of the molecular composition or similarity to cultured coffee except having compounds that are in green coffee and that a third company is working on the development of a similar product made from extracted molecules. Such products, for which multiple companies' R&D have acquired substantial funding, may have equal or highly similar effects, composition and taste as natural products but use less water, generate less carbon emissions, require less and relocated labor and cause no deforestation.

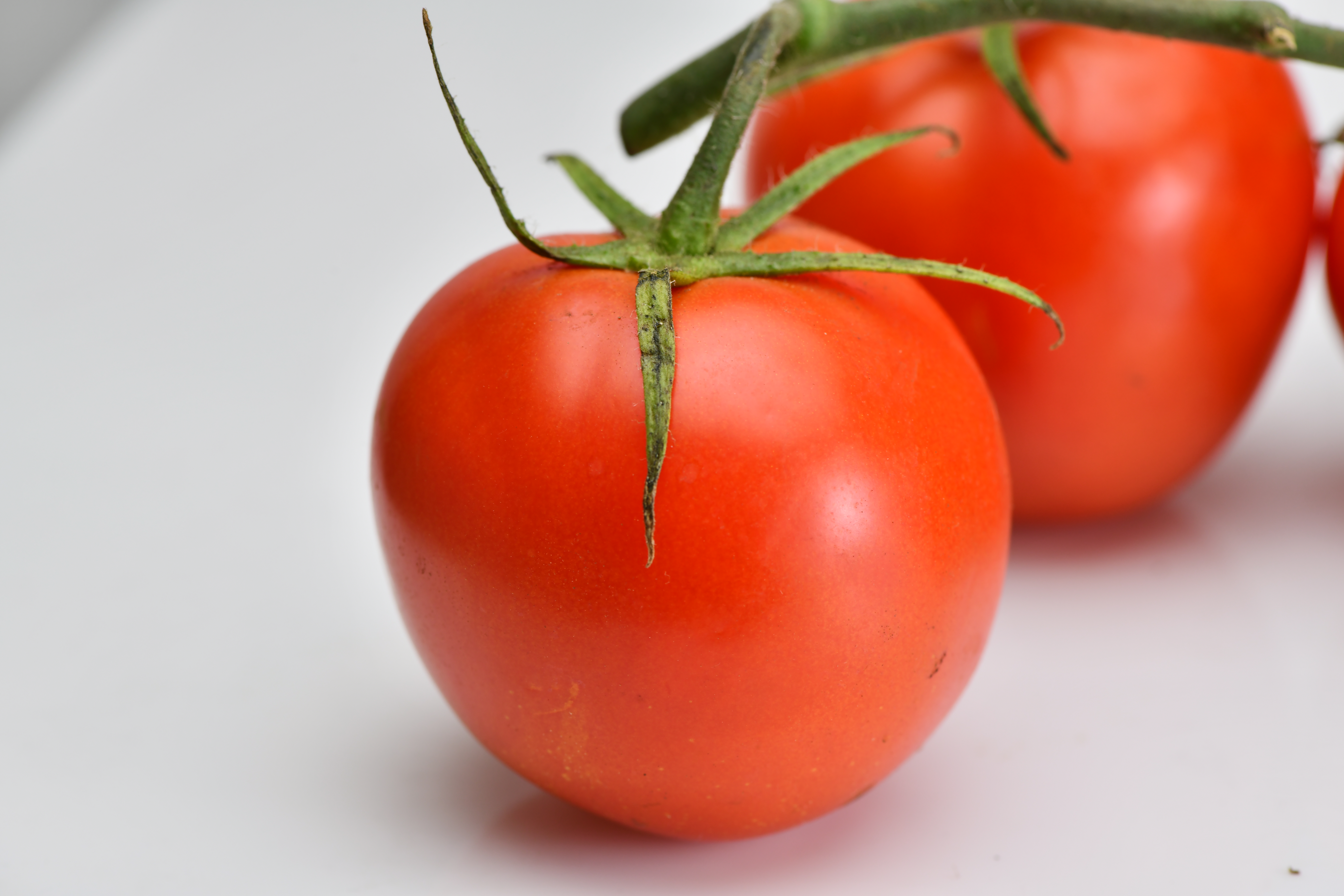
The first CRISPR-edited food, tomatoes, goes on public sale.

- Researchers report the world's first artificial synthesis of starch. The material essential for many products and the most common carbohydrate in human diets was made from CO_{2} in a cell-free process and could reduce land, pesticide and water use as well as greenhouse gas emissions while increasing food security.
- Media outlets report that in Japan the first CRISPR-edited food has gone on public sale. Tomatoes were genetically modified for around five times the normal amount of possibly calming GABA. CRISPR was first applied in tomatoes in 2014.
- Biomedical researchers demonstrate a switchable Yamanaka factors-reprogramming-based approach for regeneration of damaged heart without tumor-formation with success in mice if the intervention is done immediately before or after a heart attack.
- The World Health Organization endorses the first malaria vaccine – the antiparasitic RTS,S.
- A new eco-friendly way of extracting and separating rare earth elements is described, using a bacteria-derived protein called lanmodulin, which binds easily to the metals.
- Medical researchers announce that on 25 September the first successful xenotransplantation of a, genetically engineered, pig kidney, along with the pig thymus gland to make the immune system recognize it as part of the body, to a brain-dead human with no immediate signs of rejection, moving the practice closer to clinical trials with some of the living humans waiting for kidney transplants.
- Researchers report the development of chewing gums that could mitigate COVID-19 spread. The ingredients – CTB-ACE2 proteins grown via plants – bind to the virus.
- Bionanoengineers report a novel therapy for spinal cord injury – an injectable gel of nanofibers that contain moving molecules that cause cellular repair signaling and mimic the matrix around cells. The therapy enabled paralyzed mice to walk again.
- Biochemists report one of the first supercomputational approaches for the development of new antibiotic derivatives against antimicrobial resistance.
- Scientists report the development of a vaccine of mRNAs for the body build 19 proteins in tick saliva which, by enabling quick development of erythema (itchy redness) at the bite site, protects guinea pigs against Lyme disease from ticks.
- Sri Lanka announces that it will lift its import ban on pesticides and herbicides, explained by both a lack of sudden changes to widely applied practices or education systems and contemporary economics and, by extension, food security, protests and high food costs. The effort for the first transition to a completely organic farming nation was challenged by effects of the COVID-19 pandemic.
- A team of scientists reports a new form of biological reproduction in the, <1 mm sized, xenobots that are made up of and are emersed in frog cells.
- A method of DNA data storage with 100 times the density of previous techniques is announced.
- A stem cell-based treatment for Type 1 diabetes is announced.
- Scientists demonstrate that grown brain cells integrated into digital systems can carry out goal-directed tasks with performance-scores. In particular, playing a simulated (via electrophysiological stimulation) Pong which the cells learned to play faster than known machine intelligence systems, albeit to a lower skill-level than both AI and humans. Moreover, the study suggests it provides "first empirical evidence" of information-processing capacity differences between neurons from different species. Such technologies are referred to as Organoid Intelligence (OI).
- Researchers report the development of face masks that glow under ultraviolet light if they contain SARS-CoV-2 when the filter is taken out and sprayed with a fluorescent dye that contains antibodies from ostrich eggs.
- Scientists report the development of a genome editing system, called "twin prime editing", which surpasses the original prime editing system reported in 2019 in that it allows editing large sequences of DNA, addressing the method's key drawback.
- An mRNA vaccine against HIV with promising results in tests with mice and primates is reported.
- A vaccine to remove senescent cells, a key driver of the aging process, is demonstrated in mice by researchers from Japan.
- Scientists call for accelerated efforts in the development of broadly protective vaccines, especially a universal coronavirus vaccine that durably protects not just against all SARS-CoV-2 variants but also other coronaviruses, including already identified animal coronaviruses with pandemic potential.
- Researchers report the development of DNA-based "nanoantennas" that attach to proteins and produce a signal via fluorescence when these perform their biological functions, in particular for distinct conformational changes.
- The first CRISPR-gene-edited seafood and second set of CRISPR-edited food has gone on public sale in Japan: two fish of which one species grows to twice the size of natural specimens due to disruption of leptin, which controls appetite, and the other grows to 1.2 the natural size with the same amount of food due to disabled myostatin, which inhibits muscle growth.

=== 2022 ===
- Scientists report the development of sensors to gather and identify DNA of animals from air (airborne eDNA).
- A team reports the fastest ever sequencing of a human genome, accomplished in just five hours and two minutes.
- A chip with molecular circuit components in single-molecule (bio)sensors is demonstrated.
- Bionanotechnologists report the development of a viable biosensor, ROSALIND 2.0, that can detect levels of diverse water pollutants.
- Researchers report the development of 3D-printed nano-"skyscraper" electrodes that house cyanobacteria for extracting substantially more sustainable bioenergy from their photosynthesis than before.
- Genetic engineers report field test results that show CRISPR-based gene knockout of KRN2 in maize and OsKRN2 in rice increased grain yields by ~10% and ~8% and did not find any negative effects.
- Publication of research reporting the sequencing of the remaining gap of the Human genome.
- Researchers report that CRISPR-Cas9 gene editing has been used to boost vitamin D in tomatoes.
- Scientists report the first 3D-printed lab-grown wood. It is unclear if it could ever be used on a commercial scale (e.g. with sufficient production efficiency and quality).
- Researchers report a robotic finger covered in a type of manufactured living human skin.
- Researchers report the controlled growth of diverse foods in the dark via solar energy and electrocatalysis-based artificial photosynthesis as a potential way to increase energy efficiency of food production and reduce its environmental impacts.
- News outlets report about the development of algae biopanels by a company for sustainable energy generation with unclear viability after other researchers built the self-powered BIQ house prototype in 2013.
- Researchers report the development of deep learning software that can design proteins that contain prespecified functional sites.

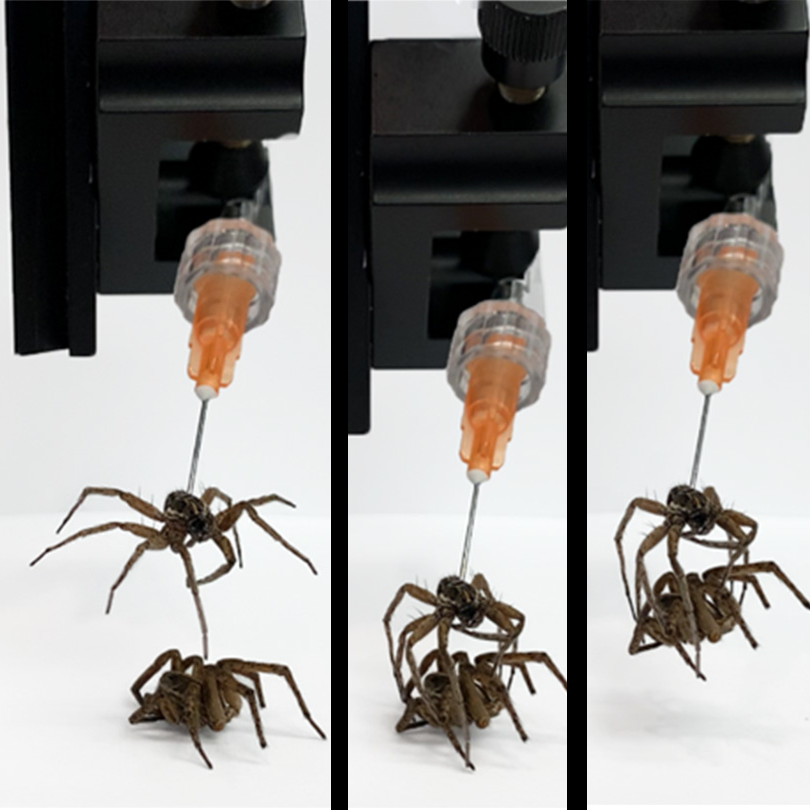
Researchers introduce and demonstrate the concept of necrobotics.

- Researchers introduce the concept of necrobotics and demonstrate it by repurposing dead spiders as robotic grippers by activating their gripping arms via applying pressurized air.
- DeepMind announces that its AlphaFold program has uncovered the structures of more than 200 million folded proteins, essentially all of those known to science.
- The creation of artificial neurons that can receive and release dopamine (chemical signals rather than electrical signals) and communicate with natural rat muscle and brain cells is reported, with potential for use in BCIs/prosthetics.
- Multiple gene editing of soybean is shown to improve photosynthesis and boost yields by 20%.
- First report of Synthetic embryos grown exclusively from mouse embryonic stem cells, without sperm or eggs or a uterus, with natural-like development and some surviving until day 8.5 where early organogenesis, including formation of foundations of a brain, occurs. They grew in vitro and subsequently ex utero in an artificial womb developed the year before by the same group.
- Scientists elaborate a need for an evidence-based reform of regulation of genetically modified crops (moving from regulation based on characteristics of the development-process to characteristics of the product) in a paywalled article.

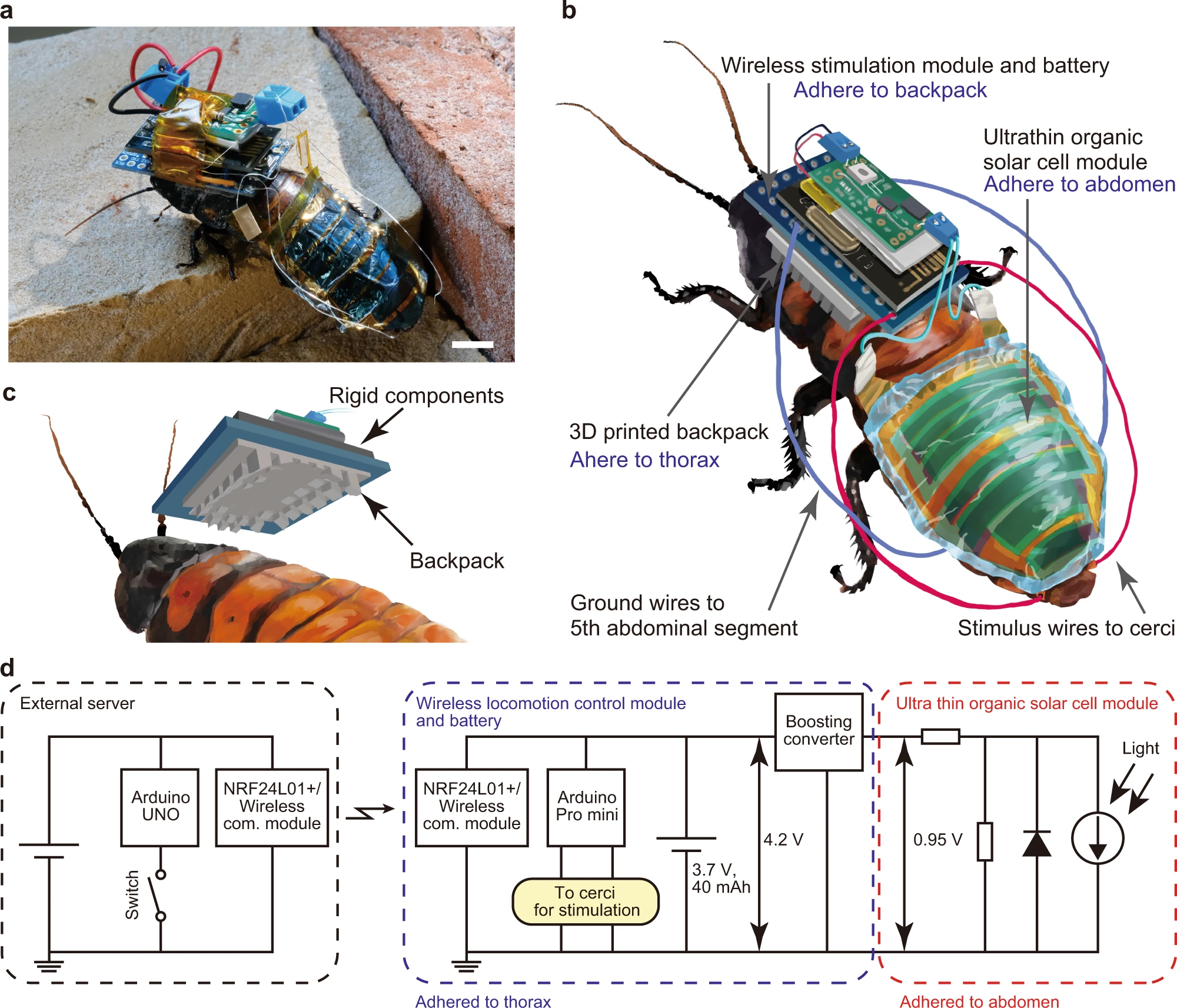
Remote controlled cyborg cockroaches.

- Researchers report the development of remote controlled cyborg cockroaches functional if moving to sunlight for recharging.
- A novel synthetic biology-based process for recycling of plastics mixtures is presented.
- Emulate researchers assess advantages of using liver-chips predicting drug-induced liver injury which could reduce the high costs and time needed in drug development workflows/pipelines, sometimes described as the pharmaceutical industry's "productivity crisis".
- In a paywalled article, American scientists propose policy-based measures to reduce large risks from life sciences research – such as pandemics through accident or misapplication. Risk management measures may include novel international guidelines, effective oversight, improvement of US policies to influence policies globally, and identification of gaps in biosecurity policies along with potential approaches to address them.
- News reports about the development in China of an edible, plant-based ink derived from food waste, which could be used in 3D printing of scaffolds to reduce the cost of cultured meat.

==== Medical applications ====
Some of these items may also have potential nonmedical applications and vice versa.

- The first successful xenogeneic heart transplant, from a genetically modified pig to a human patient, is reported.
- Microbiologists demonstrate an individually adjusted phage-antibiotic combination as an antimicrobial resistance treatment, calling for scaling up the research and further development of this approach.
- Scientists regrow the missing legs of adult frogs, which are naturally unable to regenerate limbs, within 1.5 years using a five-drug mixture applied for 24 hours via a silicone wearable bioreactor.
- Scientists report the detection of anomalous unknown-host SARS-CoV-2 lineages with RT-qPCR-based wastewater surveillance.
- Researchers demonstrate a spinal cord stimulator that enables patients with spinal cord injury to walk again via epidural electrical stimulation (EES) with substantial neurorehabilitation-progress during the first day. On the same day, a separate team reports the first engineered functional human (motor-)neuronal networks derived from iPSCs from the patient for implantation to regenerate injured spinal cord showing success in tests with mice.
- A new therapy called CINDELA is reported by scientists in South Korea, which uses CRISPR-Cas9 to kill cancer cells without harming normal tissues.
- A new compact CRISPR gene editing tool better suited for therapeutic (temporary) RNA editing than Cas13 is reported, Cas7-11, – of which an early version was used for in vitro editing in 2021.
- The world's smallest remote-controlled walking robot, measuring just half a millimetre wide, is demonstrated. Potential applications include the clearing of blocked arteries.
- Success of record-long (3 days rather than usually <12 hours) of human transplant organ preservation with machine perfusion of a liver is reported. It could possibly be extended to 10 days and prevent substantial cell damage by low temperature preservation methods. On the same day, a separate study reports new cryoprotectant solvents, tested with cells, that could preserve organs by the latter methods for much longer with substantially reduced damage.
- First success of a clinical trial for a 3D bioprinted transplant, an external ear to treat microtia, that is made from the patient's own cells is reported.
- Researchers describe a new light-activated 'photoimmunotherapy' for brain cancer in vitro. They believe it could join surgery, chemotherapy, radiotherapy and immunotherapy as a fifth major form of cancer treatment.
- Researchers, health organizations and regulators are discussing, investigating and partly recommending COVID-19 vaccine boosters that mix the original vaccine formulation with Omicron-adjusted parts – such as spike proteins of a specific Omicron subvariant – to better prepare the immune system to recognize a wide variety of variants amid substantial and ongoing immune evasion by Omicron.

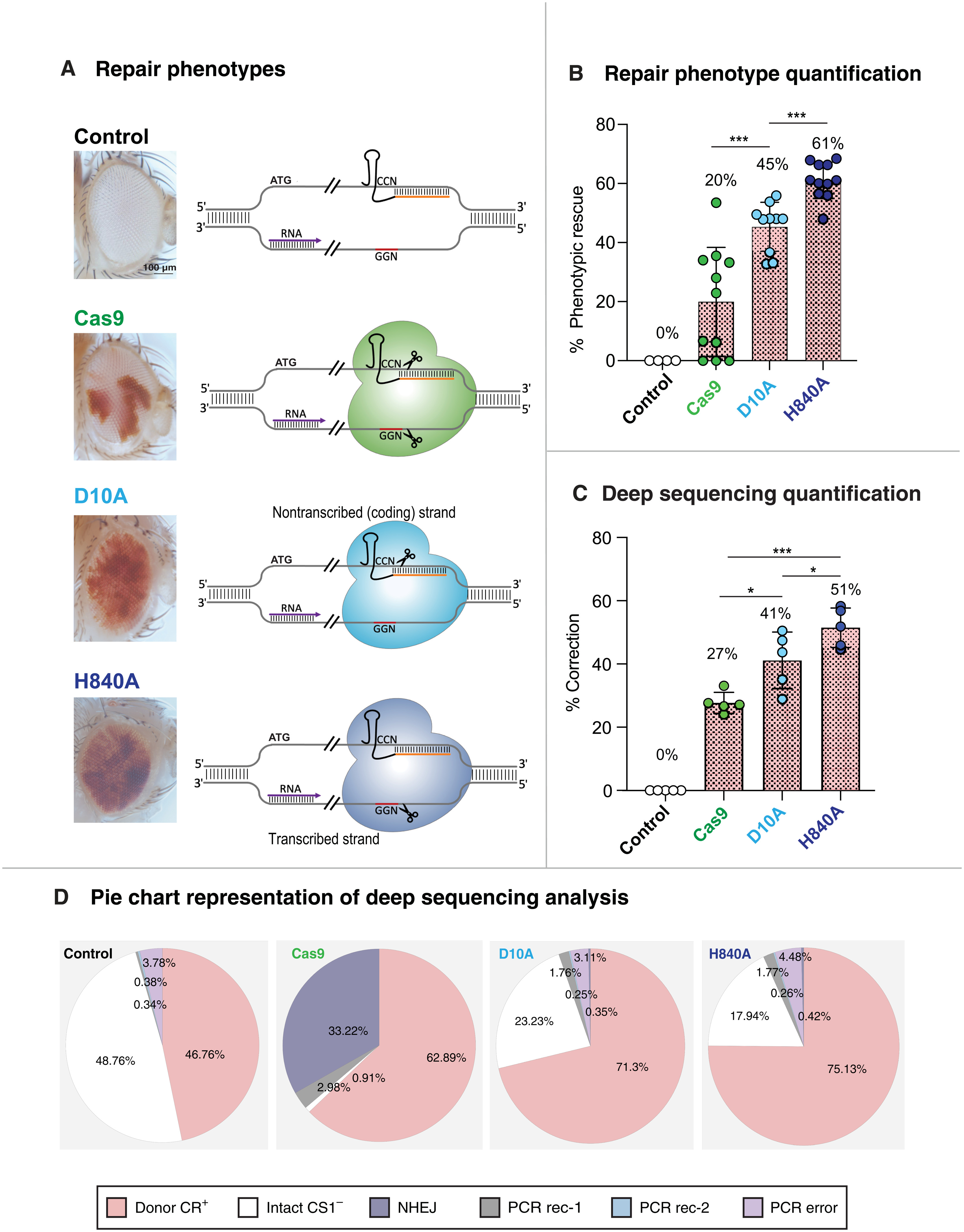
A new CRISPR gene editing/repair tool alternative to fully active Cas9 is reported.

- A new CRISPR gene editing/repair tool alternative to fully active Cas9 is reported – Cas9-derived nickases mediated homologous chromosome-templated repair, applicable to organisms whose matching chromosome has the desired gene/s, which is demonstrated to be more effective than Cas9 and cause fewer off-target edits.
- Scientists report an organ perfusion system that can restore, i.e. on the cellular level, multiple vital (pig) organs one hour after death (during which the body had warm ischaemia), after reporting a similar method/system for reviving (pig) brains hours after death in 2019. This could be used to preserve donor organs or for revival in medical emergencies.
- Lab-made cartilage gel based on a synthetic hydrogel composite is found to have greater strength and wear resistance than natural cartilage, which could enable the durable resurfacing of damaged articulating joints.
- A bioengineered cornea made from pig's skin is shown to restore vision to blind people. It can be mass-produced and stored for up to two years, unlike donated human corneas that are scarce and must be used within two weeks.
- A weak spot in the spike protein of SARS-CoV-2 is described by researchers, which an antibody fragment called VH Ab6 can attach to, potentially neutralising all major variants of the virus. On 11 August, researchers report a single antibody, SP1-77, that could potentially neutralize all known variants of the virus via a novel mechanism, not by not preventing the virus from binding to ACE2 receptors but by blocking it from fusing with host cells' membranes.
- A university reports the first successful transplantation of an organoid into a human, first announced on 7 July, with the underlying study being published in February.
- Researchers report the development of a highly effective CRISPR-Cas9 genome editing method without expensive viral vectors, enabling e.g. novel anti-cancer CAR-T cell therapies.

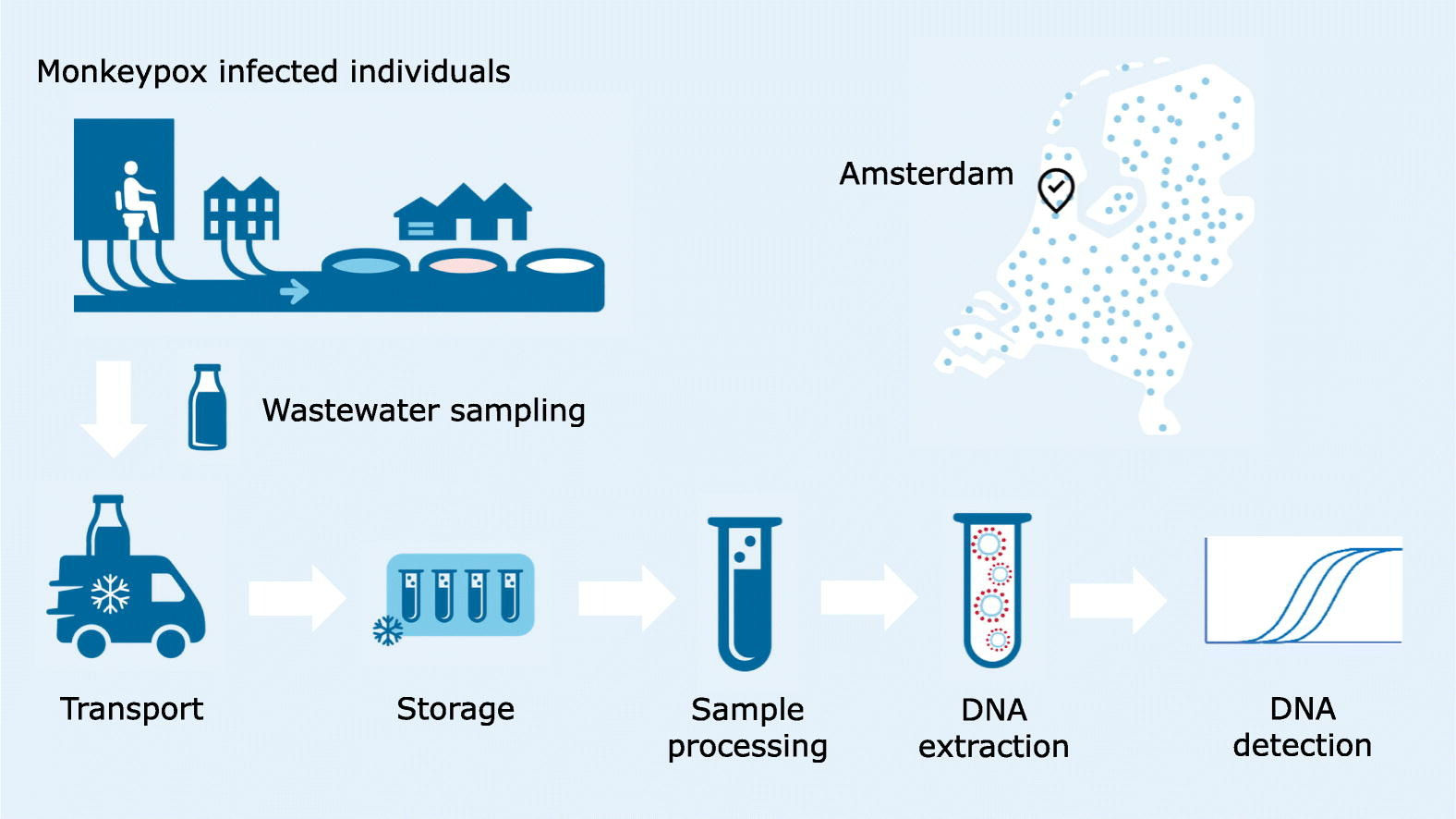
Wastewater surveillance is used to detect monkeypox

- Wastewater surveillance, which substantially expanded during the COVID-19 pandemic is used to detect monkeypox, with one team of researchers describing their qualitative detection method.
- A new malaria vaccine developed by the University of Oxford is shown to be ~80% effective at preventing the disease.
- A study adds to the accumulating research indicating postexposure antiviral TIPs could be an effective countermeasure that reduces COVID-19 transmission.
- India and China approve the two first nasal COVID-19 vaccines which may (as boosters) also reduce transmission (sterilizing immunity).
- Nanoengineers report the development of biocompatible microalgae hybrid microrobots for active drug-delivery in the lungs and the gastrointestinal tract (GT). The microrobots are related to medical nanobots and proved effective in tests with mice. A separate team reports the development of 'RoboCap', a robotic drug delivery capsule that enhances drug absorption by tunneling through the mucus layer in the GT.
- A magnetical guidance system with engineered bacterial microbots for 'precision targeting' is demonstrated to be effective for fighting cancer in mice.
- The first clinical trial of laboratory-grown red blood cells transfused into people begins.
- A new CRISPR-Cas9 gene editing tool for large edits without problematic double-stranded breaks is demonstrated, PASTE.
- Researchers report the development of a blood test, SOBA, for Alzheimer's screening via levels of toxic amyloid beta oligomers with sensitivity and specificity of apparently 99%. A separate study reports another well-performing blood test to detect Alzheimer's disease via biomarker brain-derived tau.

=== 2023 ===
- Cellular bioengineers report the development of nonreplicating bacterial 'cyborg cells' (similar to artificial cells) using a novel approach, assembling a synthetic hydrogel polymer network as an artificial cytoskeleton inside the bacteria. The cells can resist stressors that would kill natural cells and e.g. invade cancer cells or potentially act as biosensors.
- News outlets report on a study (Nov 22) demonstrating locust antennae implanted as biosensors into (bio-hybrid) robots for AI-interpreted machine olfaction.

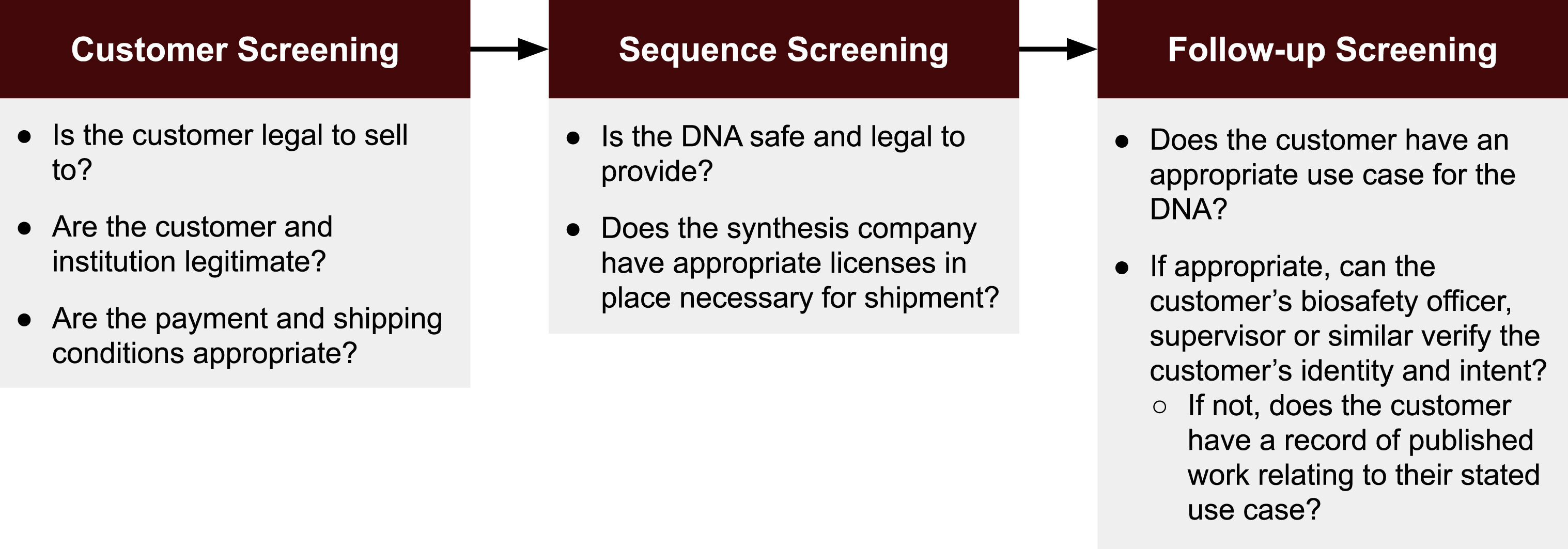
Safety-by-design ways like DNA screening for biosafety and biosecurity to prevent engineered pandemics

- Scientists review safety-by-design technology- and policy-based approaches to ensure biosafety and biosecurity to prevent engineered pathogen pandemics, such as sequence screening and biocontainment systems, some of which already implemented and part of regulations to some degree.

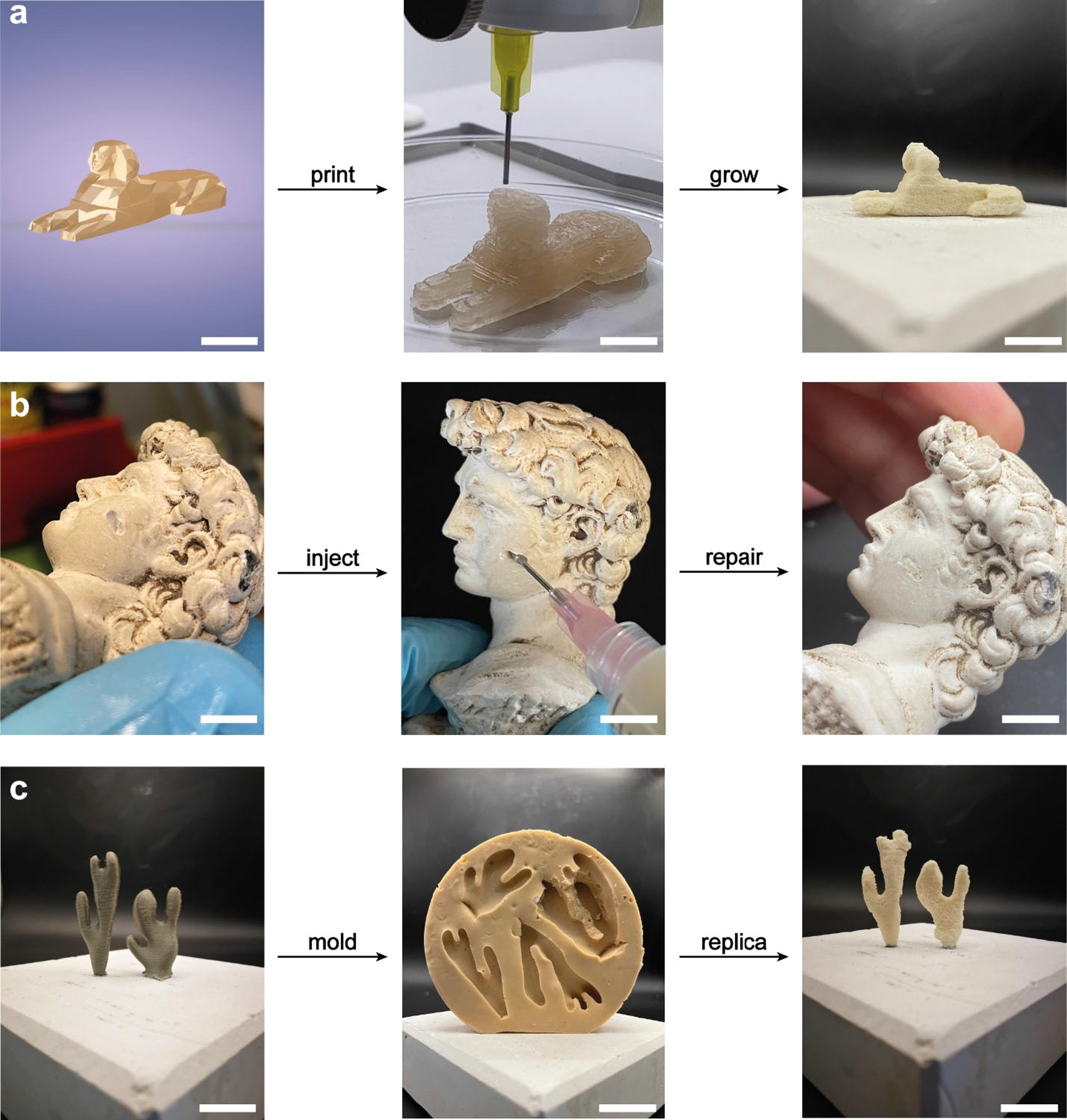
A bone-like biocomposite 3D printing ink, BactoInk

- Researchers report the development of a biocomposite 3D printing ink, BactoInk, containing calcium carbonate-producing microorganisms which could be used for restoration, artificial reefs and potentially bone-repair.
- The growing of electrodes in the living tissue of zebrafish (including in the brain) and medicinal leeches is demonstrated, using an injectable gel and the animals' own endogenous molecules to trigger the formation. The researchers claim their breakthrough enables "a new paradigm in bioelectronics."

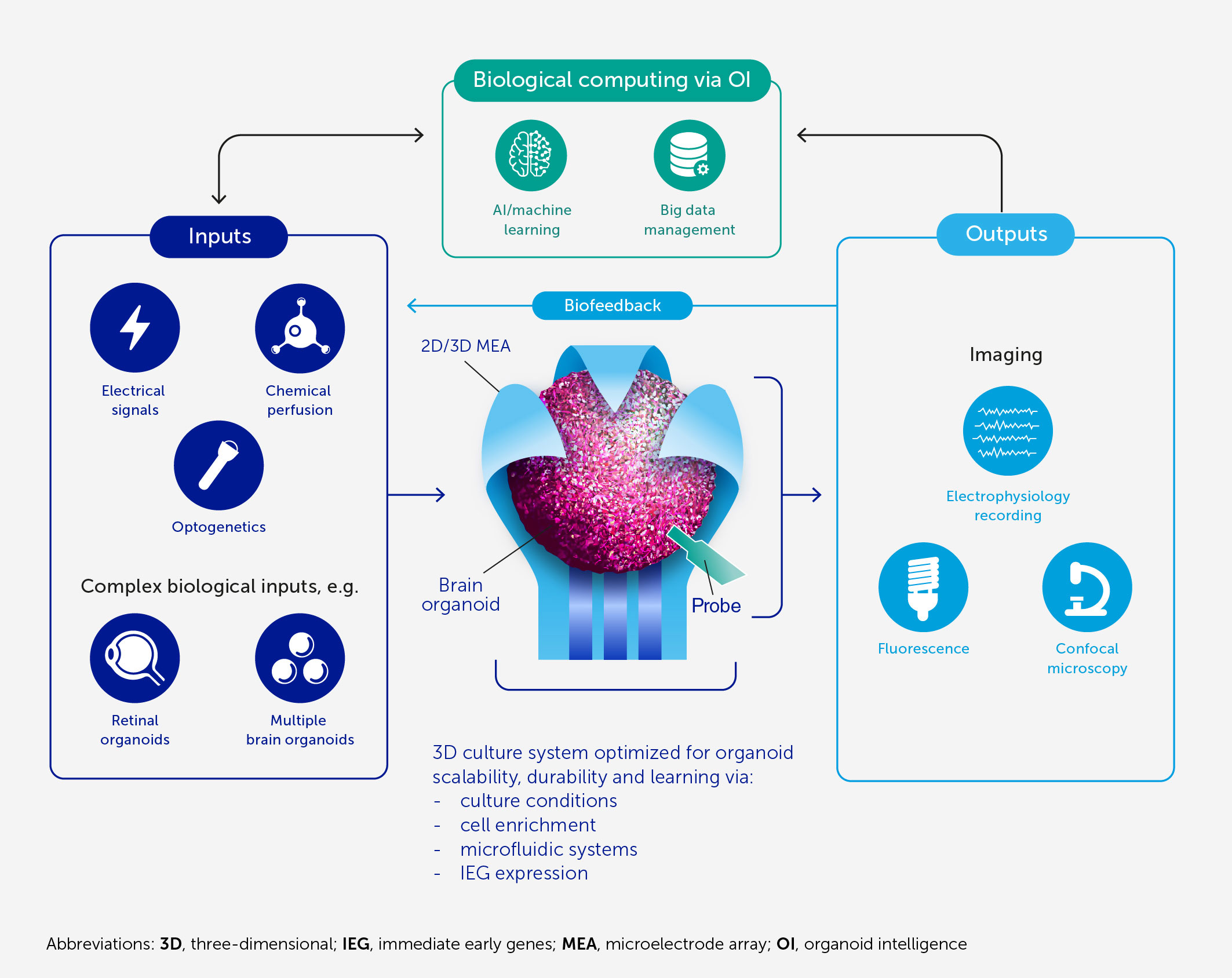
Scientists coin and outline a new field 'organoid intelligence' (OI)

- Scientists coalesce recent developments using human brain organoids into a new field they term organoid intelligence (OI), seeking to harness OI for computing – as a novel type of AI – in an ethically responsible way. Networks of such miniature tissues could become functional using stimulus-response training or organoid-computer interfaces – to potentially become "more powerful than silicon-based computing" for a range of tasks – and could also be used for research of various pathophysiologies, brain development, human learning, memory and intelligence, and new therapeutic approaches against brain diseases.
- Biological organoid intelligence, 'Brainoware', is demonstrated to solve computational tasks in a preprint, with implications for bioethics and potential bottlenecks and limits of nonbio-AI.
- A bacterial hydrogenase enzyme, Huc, for biohydrogen energy from the air is reported.
- A study reports a bacterial new PVC injection system-based way of protein delivery, one of the biggest unsolved problems of gene editing.
- Researchers demonstrate functional integration of a magnetically steered microbot containing neurons, 'Mag-Neurobot', in a mouse "organotypic hippocampal slice" (OHS) as physical (semi-)artificial neurons.
- Neuroengineers demonstrate induction of a torpor-like state in mice via ultrasound stimulation.
- Researchers report in a preprint the CRISPR alternative Fanzor naturally present in eukaryotes with several potential advantages over CRISPR in genome editing, notably smaller size and higher selectiveness. A separate team further demonstrates the potential of this class of genome editors.
- A new method to deliver drugs into the inner ear is demonstrated with a gene-therapy against hearing loss in mice.
- Researchers demonstrate encoding and storing data – small images – as DNA without new DNA synthesis by recording light exposure into bacterial DNA via optogenetic circuits. The 'biological camera' extends chemical and electrical interface techniques.
- Scientists use CRISPR gene-editing to reduce the lignin content in poplar trees by as much as 50%, offering a potentially more sustainable method of fiber production.
- Researchers report a production method for spider silk fibers from gene-edited transgenic silkworms for a sustainable alternative material six times stronger than Kevlar.
- In 10 studies, researchers of the Sc2.0 project report yeast with a half-synthetic genome.
- Researchers report the deep learning-based discovery of nearly 200 functionally diverse natural machineries for CRISPR gene editing.
- Researchers demonstrate multicellular microbots grown from a human cell, "anthrobots", that can move around in tissues in vitro.

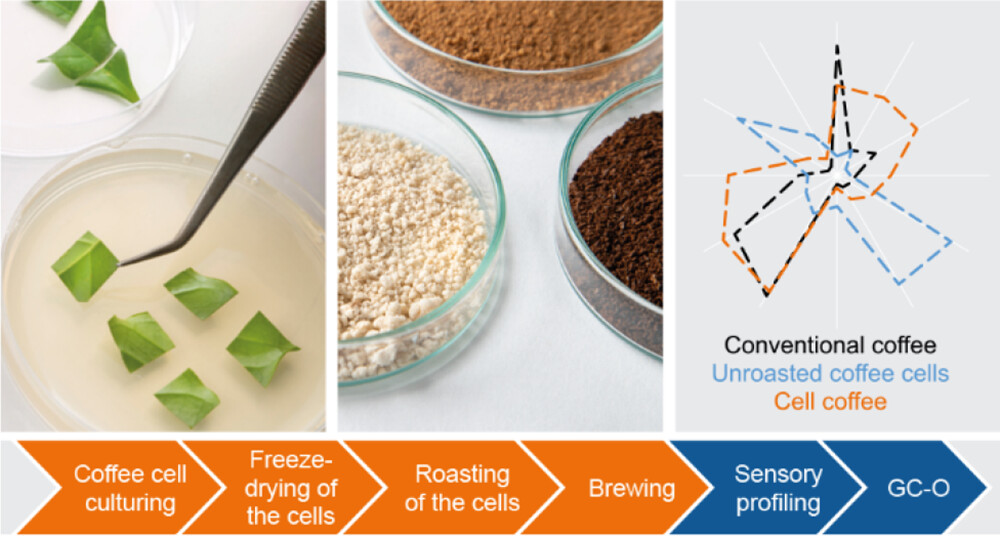
Cell culture-based coffee

- Notable innovations: a large language model (ProGen) that can generate functional protein sequences with a predictable function, with the input including tags specifying protein properties, a deep-learning model (ZFDesign) for zinc finger design for any genomic target for gene- and epigenetic-editing, a second biotech company commercializes sustainable MS mycelium protein after Quorn in 1983, a biodegradable and biorecyclable glass, nonalcoholic first powdered beer (Dryest Beer), a phase-change materials embedded in wood-based energy-saving building material, cultivated meat from extinct mammoths as demonstration of potential, first yeast-based cow-free dairy (Remilk), a method for fat tissue cultured meat, an engineered probiotic against alcohol-induced damage, exogenously administered bioengineered sensors that amplify urinary cancer biomarkers for detection, an open source automated experimentation science platform (BacterAI) for predicting microbial metabolism with little data, an open source transfer learning-based system (Geneformer) for predicting how networks of interconnected human genes control or affect the function of cells, first approval for two cultured meat products in the U.S. and two of the first worldwide, transgenic soya beans containing pig protein (Piggy Sooy) are reported, a performant open source AI software for protein design (RFdiffusion) is introduced, a viable real-time pathogen air quality (pAQ) sensor is demonstrated, a CRISPR-free base editing system without guide RNA that enables also editing chloroplast and mitochondrial genomes with precision (CyDENT), genetically engineered marine microorganism for breaking down PET in salt water, taste-tested bioreactor-grown cultured coffee.

==== Medical applications ====
- Researchers demonstrate the use of ants as biosensors to detect cancer via urine, a mice-tested engineered probiotic against autoimmunity in the brain as in multiple sclerosis, mice-tested engineered bacteria to detect cancer DNA, 3D printed of hair follicles on lab-grown skin.
- AI in drug development successes
  - The world's first COVID-19 drug designed by generative AI is approved for human use, with clinical trials expected to begin in China. The new drug, ISM3312, is developed by Insilico Medicine.
  - A new AI algorithm developed by Baidu is shown to boost the antibody response of COVID-19 mRNA vaccines by 128 times.
  - AI is used to develop an experimental antibiotic called abaucin, which is shown to be effective against A. baumannii.
  - AI is used to find senolytics.
  - A science writer provides an overview of "the nascent industry of AI-designed drugs".
  - A new class of antibiotic candidates, able to kill methicillin-resistant Staphylococcus aureus (MRSA) is identified using explainable deep learning.
- The first successful transplant of a functional cryopreserved mammalian kidney is reported. The study demonstrates a "nanowarming" technique for vitrification for up-to-100 days preservation of transplant organs.

=== 2024 ===
- Notable innovation: rice grains as scaffolds containing cultured animal cells are demonstrated, precision fermentation-derived beta-lactoglobulin is released as a substitute for whey protein amid growth of a nascent animal-free dairy industry.

=== 2025 ===
- The U.S. Food and Drug Administration approves Zevaskyn, a drug for treating epidermolysis bullosa dystrophica.
- Four cell therapy companies die.

== See also ==
- Bioeconomy
- Bioelectronics
- Biotechnology risk
- Working animal
- Synthetic biology
- Environmental impact of pesticides#Alternatives
- Bioethics#Issues
- Bioinformatics
- CRISPR gene editing#Recent events
- Nanobiotechnology
- Timeline of sustainable energy research 2020–present#Bioenergy and biotechnology
- Timeline of biology and organic chemistry#1990–present
- Timeline of the history of genetics

=== Medical ===
- Artificial intelligence in healthcare
- Diagnostic microbiology
- Gene therapy#2020s
- List of emerging technologies#Medical
- Regeneration in humans
- Timeline of human vaccines
- Timeline of medicine and medical technology#2000–2022
- Timeline of senescence research
