= Necrobotics =

Practice of using biotic materials as robotic components

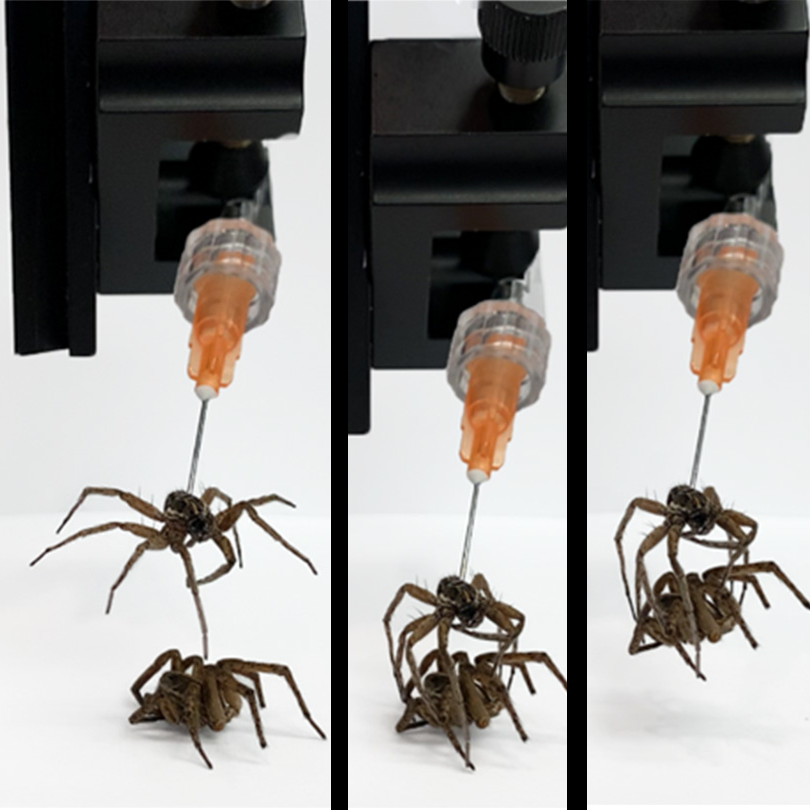
Demonstration of the concept

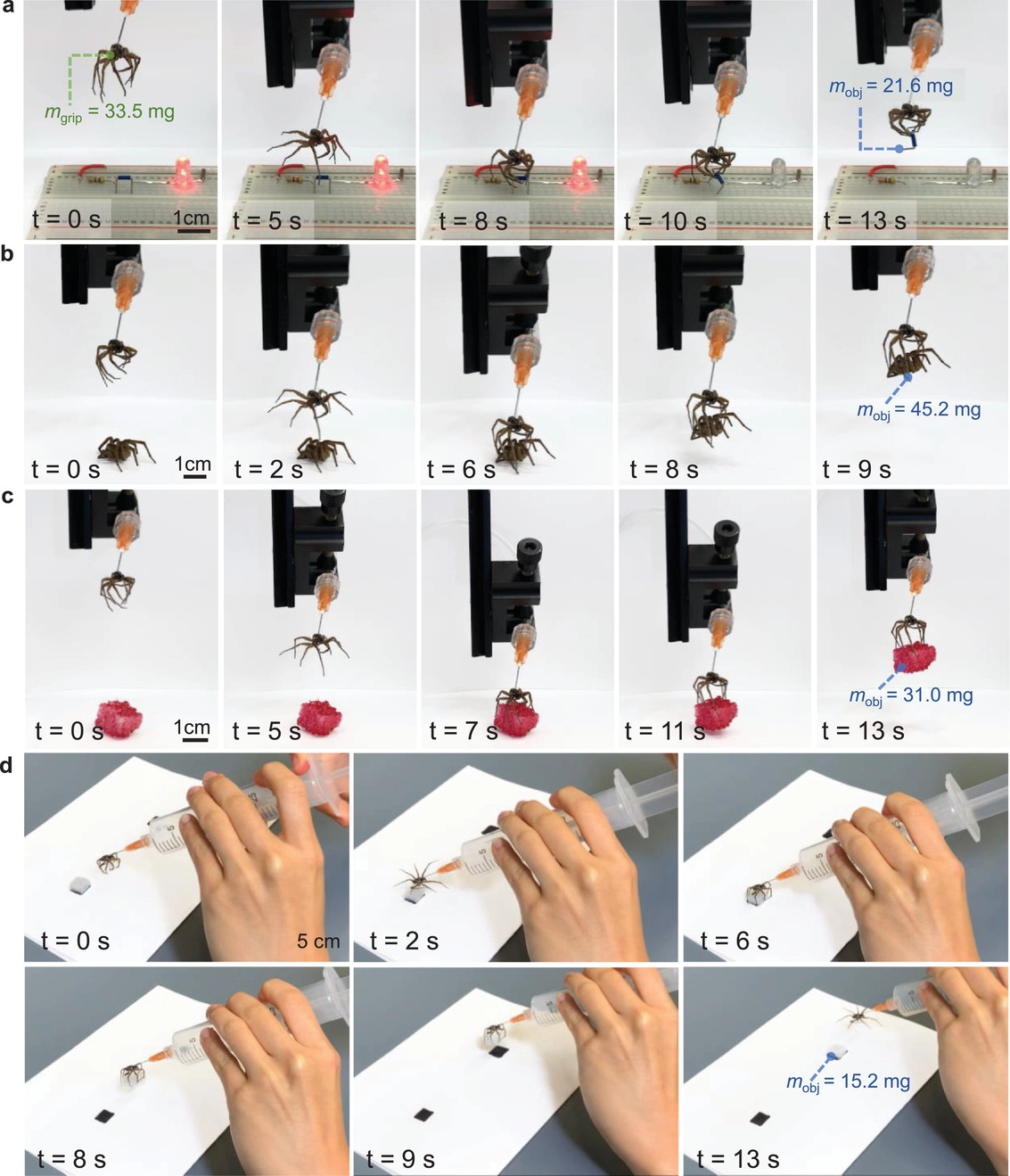
A "necrobotic" gripper is fashioned from a dead spider and used to lift objects.

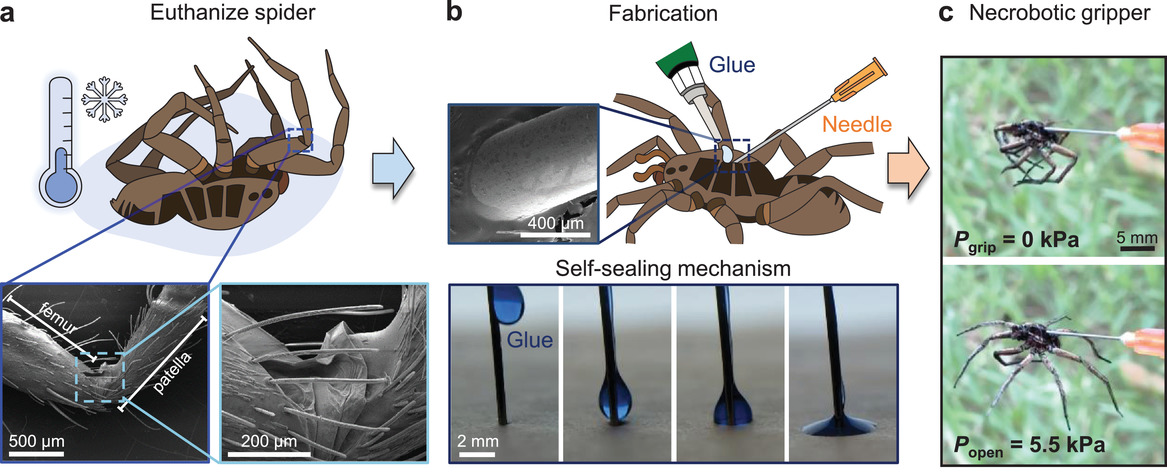
Procedure explanation

Necrobotics is the practice of using biotic materials (or dead organisms) as robotic components. Necrobotics can serve as an alternative to mechanical components that are difficult to manufacture by using biological components designed by natural selection in order to exploit the highly developed selective design implemented in biological lifeforms via the process of evolution.

In July 2022, researchers in the Preston Innovation Lab at Rice University in Houston, Texas, published a paper in Advanced Science introducing the concept and demonstrating its capability by repurposing dead spiders as robotic grippers and applying pressurized air to activate their gripping arms.

In April 2025, researchers at Shinshu University created a “bio-hybrid drone” using silk-worm moth antennae to detect the source of a smell.

In November 2025, researchers at McGill University demonstrated the use of a mosquito proboscis as a fine nozzle in experimental 3D printing.

Necrobotics utilizes the spider's organic hydraulic system and their compact legs to create an efficient and simple gripper system. The necrobotic spider gripper is capable of lifting small and light objects, thereby serving as an alternative to complex and costly small mechanical grippers.

== Background ==
The main appeal of the spider's body in necrobotics is its compact leg mechanism and use of hydraulic pressure. The spider's anatomy utilizes a simple hydraulic (fluid) pressure system. Spider legs have flexor muscles that naturally constrict their legs when relaxed. A force is required to straighten and extend their legs, which spiders accomplish by pumping hemolymph fluid (blood) through their joints as a means of hydraulic pressure. It takes no external power to curl their legs due to their flexor muscles' natural curled state.

In July 2022, researchers in the Preston Innovation Lab at Rice University published a paper detailing their experiments with the gripper. Although dead spiders no longer produce hemolymph, Te Faye Yap (lead author and mechanical engineering graduate) found that pumping air through a needle into the spider's cephalothorax (main body) accomplishes the same results as hemolymph. The original hydraulic (fluid) system is essentially converted into a pneumatic (air) system.

== Fabrication ==
1. Obtain a spider
2. Euthanize the spider using a cold temperature of around -4°C for 5-7 days
3. Insert a 25 gauge hypodermic needle into the spider's cephalothorax (main body)
4. Apply glue around the needle to form a seal and allow it to dry
5. Connect a syringe or pump to the needle
6. Extend the spider's legs by pumping air in

== Testing and Data ==
=== Internal Force Versus Gripping Force ===
The typical pressure in a resting spider's legs ranges from 4 kPa to 6.1 kPa. Researchers extended the legs by increasing the spider's internal pressure to 5.5 kPa. Pumping air into the body increases the internal pressure, causing the legs to expand. Pumping air out of the body decreases internal pressure, causing the legs to contract due to their flexor leg muscles. When the internal pressure decreases to 0 kPa, the gripper would be fully closed, allowing for the gripper to grasp objects. This action demonstrates that as internal pressure decreases, the gripping force increases. Inversely, when internal pressure increases, the gripping force decreases. By gripping individual weighted acetate beads, it is found that the necrobotic gripper achieves a maximum gripping force of 0.35 millinewtons.

=== Spider Weight Versus Gripping Force ===
To estimate the gripping forces of smaller and larger spiders, researchers created a plot to predict the gripping force relative to the size of the spider. The wolf spider's body weight is relatively equal to the gripping force of its legs. The mass of the gripper is 33.5 mg and can lift 1.3 times its body weight (43.6 mg or 0.35 mN). However, with larger spiders, the gripping force relative to body weight decreases. For example, a 200-gram goliath birdeater is predicted to lift 10% of its weight (20 grams or 196 mN). Though there is an inverse relationship between spider mass and gripping force, larger spiders exert greater gripping forces than smaller spiders.

=== Gripper Lifespan ===
The necrobotic gripper's functionality is entirely reliant on the structural integrity of the spider. If the spider were to break down easily and frequently, the gripper would not be practical. Using cyclic testing, a series of repeated actions, it is found that the necrobotic gripper can actuate 700 to 1000 times. After 1000 cycles, cracks begin forming on the membrane of the leg joints due to dehydration. Weakened and decomposing joints lead to frequent breakage and replacement, thereby serving as an obstacle in applying necrobotics to real-world scenarios.

One theorized fix to this issue is applying beeswax or a lubricant to the joints. Researchers found that over 10 days, the mass of an uncoated spider decreased 17 times more than the mass of a spider coated with beeswax. Lubricating joints combats dehydration and slows the loss of organic material.

== Constraints ==
With the usage of organic material, there is a higher chance of the component decomposing and breaking down as opposed to traditional mechanical systems. There may be additional work and management required to replace these grippers if they fail. Additionally, organic inconsistencies with the spiders will yield inaccurate results. Not all wolf spiders develop the same, so gripping force and leg contraction can vary between grippers.

There are moral implications behind euthanizing spiders for robotics. The ethical boundaries that necrobotics push in the pursuit of biohybrid systems raise concerns, as opponents say it may lead to the hybridization of mammals and is intrusive to nature. Proponents respond that repurposing dead animals has been human practice for millennia and that necrobotics should be pursued to advance science.

== See also ==
- 3D bioprinting
- Biomedical engineering
- Blood substitute
- Remote control animal
- Soft robotics
- Zombie § Theoretical academic studies
