= Remote control animal =

Animals controlled remotely by humans

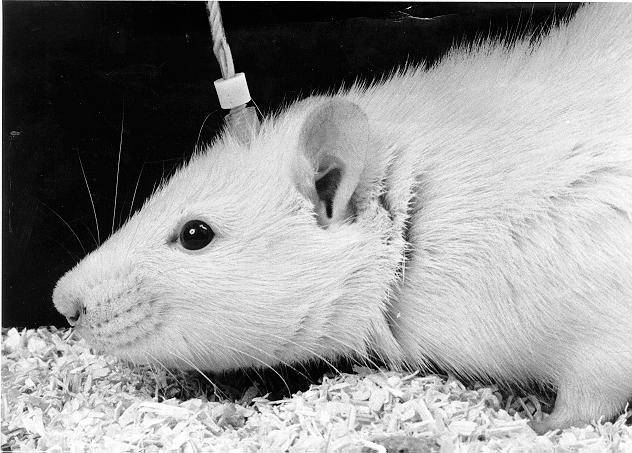
Chronic subcortical electrode implant in a laboratory rat used to deliver electrical stimulation to the brain.

Remote control animals are animals that are controlled remotely by humans. Some applications require electrodes to be implanted in the animal's nervous system connected to a receiver which is usually carried on the animal's back. The animals are controlled by the use of radio signals. The electrodes do not move the animal directly, as if controlling a robot; rather, they signal a direction or action desired by the human operator and then stimulate the animal's reward centres if the animal complies. These are sometimes called bio-robots or robo-animals. They can be considered to be cyborgs as they combine electronic devices with an organic life form and hence are sometimes also called cyborg-animals or cyborg-insects.

Because of the surgery required, and the moral and ethical issues involved, there has been criticism aimed at the use of remote control animals, especially regarding animal welfare and animal rights, especially when relatively intelligent complex animals are used. Non-invasive applications may include stimulation of the brain with ultrasound to control the animal. Some applications (used primarily for dogs) use vibrations or sound to control the movements of the animals.

Several species of animals have been successfully controlled remotely. These include moths, beetles, cockroaches, rats, dogfish sharks, mice and pigeons.

Remote control animals can be directed and used as working animals for search and rescue operations, covert reconnaissance, data-gathering in hazardous areas, or various other uses.

== Mammals ==
=== Rats ===
Several studies have examined the remote control of rats using micro-electrodes implanted into their brains and rely on stimulating the reward centre of the rat. Three electrodes are implanted; two in the ventral posterolateral nucleus of the thalamus which conveys facial sensory information from the left and right whiskers, and a third in the medial forebrain bundle which is involved in the reward process of the rat. This third electrode is used to give a rewarding electrical stimulus to the brain when the rat makes the correct move to the left or right. During training, the operator stimulates the left or right electrode of the rat making it "feel" a touch to the corresponding set of whiskers, as though it had come in contact with an obstacle. If the rat then makes the correct response, the operator rewards the rat by stimulating the third electrode.

In 2002, a team of scientists at the State University of New York remotely controlled rats from a laptop up to 500 m away. The rats could be instructed to turn left or right, climb trees and ladders, navigate piles of rubble, and jump from different heights. They could even be commanded into brightly lit areas, which rats usually avoid. It has been suggested that the rats could be used to carry cameras to people trapped in disaster zones.

In 2013, researchers reported the development of a radio-telemetry system to remotely control free-roaming rats with a range of 200 m. The backpack worn by the rat includes the mainboard and an FM transmitter-receiver, which can generate biphasic microcurrent pulses. All components in the system are commercially available and are fabricated from surface mount devices to reduce the size (25 x 15 x 2 mm) and weight (10 g with battery).

==== Ethics and welfare concerns ====
Concerns have been raised about the ethics of such studies. Even one of the pioneers in this area of study, Sanjiv Talwar, said "There's going to have to be a wide debate to see whether this is acceptable or not" and "There are some ethical issues here which I can't deny." Elsewhere he was quoted as saying "The idea sounds a little creepy." Some oppose the idea of placing living creatures under direct human command. "It's appalling, and yet another example of how the human species instrumentalises other species," says Gill Langley of the Dr Hadwen Trust based in Hertfordshire (UK), which funds alternatives to animal-based research. Gary Francione, an expert in animal welfare law at Rutgers University School of Law, says "The animal is no longer functioning as an animal," as the rat is operating under someone's control. And the issue goes beyond whether or not the stimulations are compelling or rewarding the rat to act. "There's got to be a level of discomfort in implanting these electrodes," he says, which may be difficult to justify. Talwar stated that the animal's "native intelligence" can stop it from performing some directives but with enough stimulation, this hesitation can sometimes be overcome, but occasionally cannot.

==== Non-invasive method ====
Researchers at Harvard University have created a brain-to-brain interface (BBI) between a human and a Sprague-Dawley rat. Simply by thinking the appropriate thought, the BBI allows the human to control the rat's tail. The human wears an EEG-based brain-to-computer interface (BCI), while the anesthetised rat is equipped with a focused ultrasound (FUS) computer-to-brain interface (CBI). FUS is a technology that allows the researchers to excite a specific region of neurons in the rat's brain using an ultrasound signal (350 kHz ultrasound frequency, tone burst duration of 0.5 ms, pulse repetition frequency of 1 kHz, given for 300 ms duration). The main advantage of FUS is that, unlike most brain-stimulation techniques, it is non-invasive. Whenever the human looks at a specific pattern (strobe light flicker) on a computer screen, the BCI communicates a command to the rat's CBI, which causes ultrasound to be beamed into the region of the rat's motor cortex responsible for tail movement. The researchers report that the human BCI has an accuracy of 94%, and that it generally takes around 1.5 s from the human looking at the screen to movement of the rat's tail.

Another system that non-invasively controls rats uses ultrasonic, epidermal and LED photic stimulators on the back. The system receives commands to deliver specified electrical stimulations to the hearing, pain and visual senses of the rat respectively. The three stimuli work in groups for the rat navigation.

Other researchers have dispensed with human remote control of rats and instead uses a General Regression Neural Network algorithm to analyse and model controlling of human operations.

=== Dogs ===
Dogs are often used in disaster relief, at crime scenes and on the battlefield, but it's not always easy for them to hear the commands of their handlers. A command module which contains a microprocessor, wireless radio, GPS receiver and an attitude and heading reference system (essentially a gyroscope) can be fitted to dogs. The command module delivers vibration or sound commands (delivered by the handler over the radio) to the dog to guide it in a certain direction or to perform certain actions. The overall success rate of the control system is 86.6%.

=== Mice ===
Researchers responsible for developing remote control of a pigeon using brain implants conducted a similar successful experiment on mice in 2005.

== Invertebrates ==
In 1967, Franz Huber pioneered electrical stimulation to the brain of insects and showed that mushroom body stimulation elicits complex behaviours, including the inhibition of locomotion.

=== Cockroaches ===
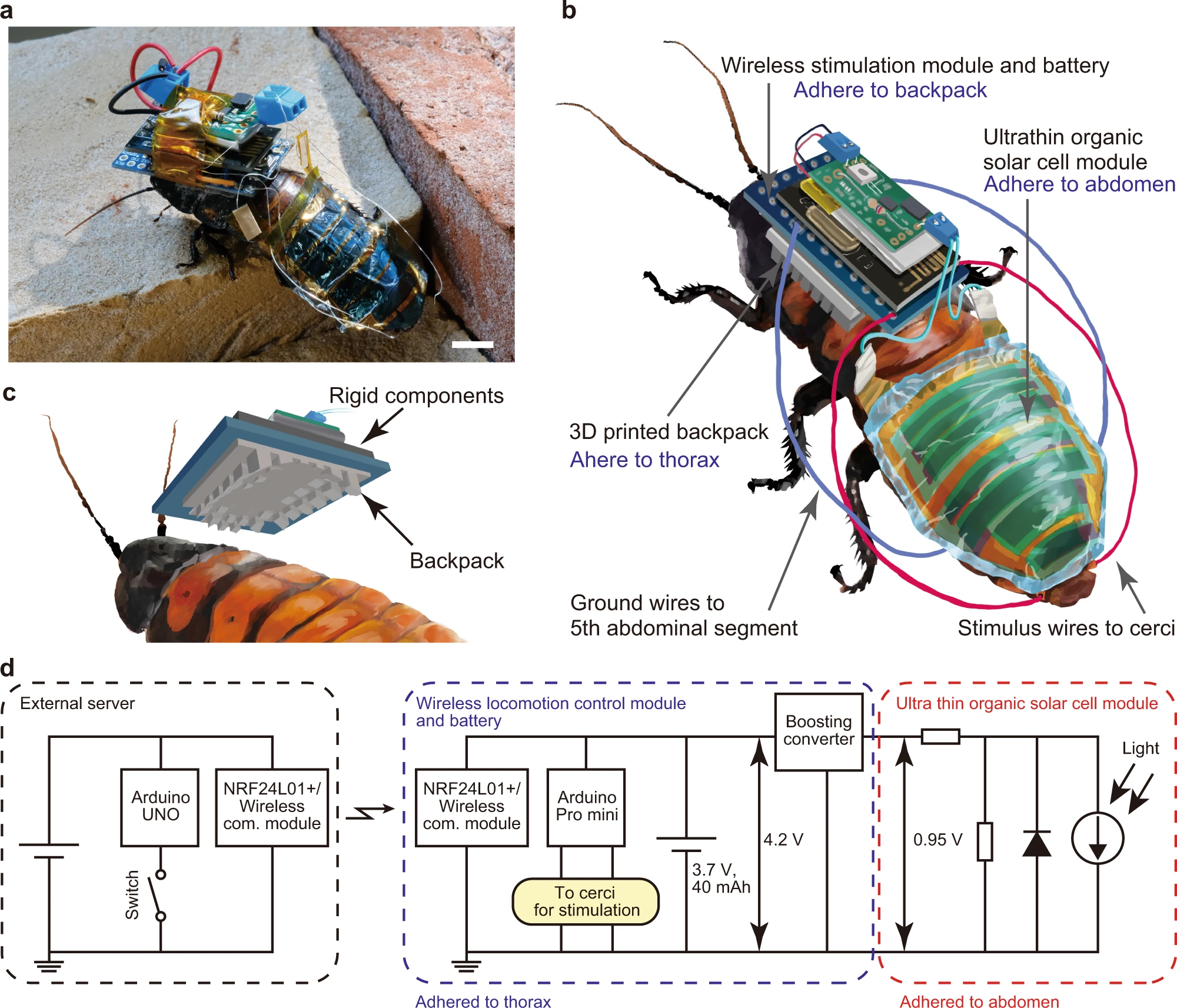
Rechargeable cyborg insects with an ultrasoft organic solar cell module

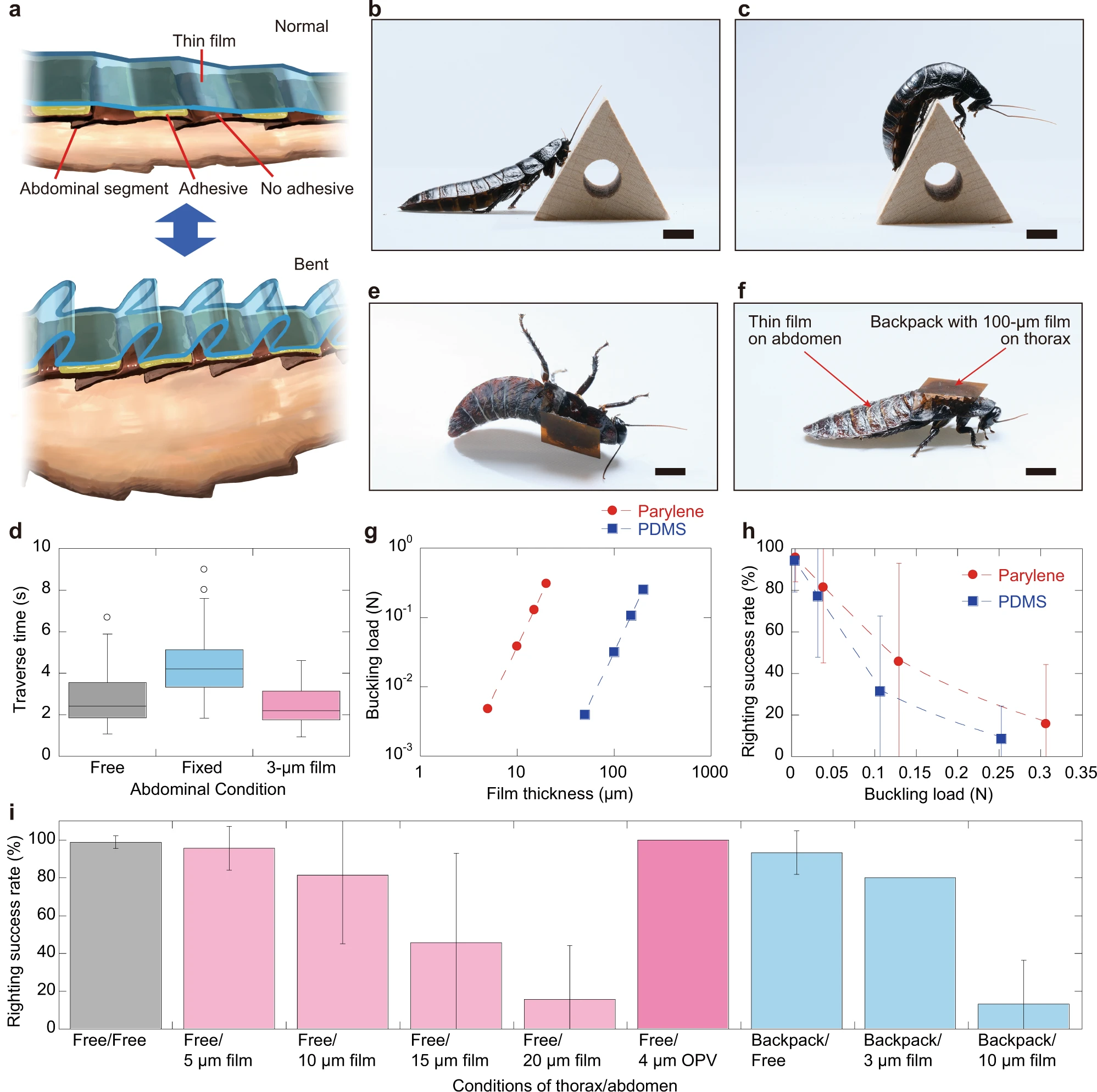
Fundamental behavioural ability with electronics in cyborg insects

RoboRoach

The US-based company Backyard Brains released the "RoboRoach", a remote controlled cockroach kit that they refer to as "The world's first commercially available cyborg". The project started as a University of Michigan biomedical engineering student senior design project in 2010 and was launched as an available beta product on 25 February 2011. The RoboRoach was officially released into production via a TED talk at the TED Global conference, and via the crowdsourcing website Kickstarter in 2013, the kit allows students to use microstimulation to momentarily control the movements of a walking cockroach (left and right) using a bluetooth-enabled smartphone as the controller. The RoboRoach was the first kit available to the general public for the remote control of an animal and was funded by the United States' National Institute of Mental Health as a device to serve as a teaching aid to promote an interest in neuroscience. This funding was due to the similarities between the RoboRoach microstimulation, and the microstimulation used in the treatments of Parkinson's disease (Deep Brain Stimulation) and deafness (Cochlear implants) in humans. Several animal welfare organizations including the RSPCA and PETA have expressed concerns about the ethics and welfare of animals in this project.

North Carolina State University

Another group at North Carolina State University has developed a remote control cockroach. Researchers at NCSU have programmed a path for cockroaches to follow while tracking their location with an Xbox Kinect. The system automatically adjusted the cockroach's movements to ensure it stayed on the prescribed path.

Robo-bug

In 2022, researchers led by RIKEN scientists, reported the development of remote controlled cyborg cockroaches functional if moved (or moving) to sunlight for recharging. They could be used e.g. for purposes of inspecting hazardous areas or quickly finding humans underneath hard-to-access rubbles at disaster sites.

=== Beetles ===
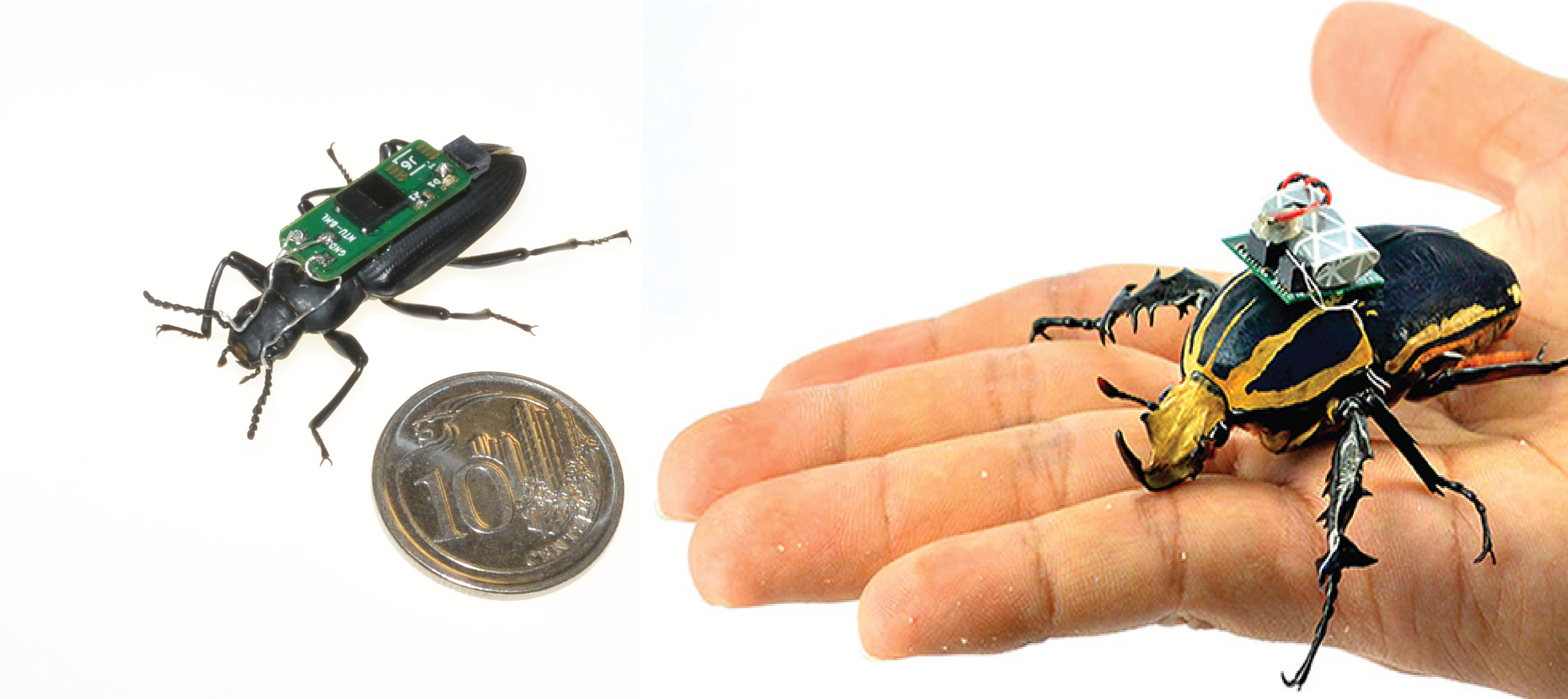
Cyborg beetles developed based on Zophobas morio (left) and Mecynorrhina torquata (right)

In 2009, remote control of the flight movements of the Cotinus texana and the much larger Mecynorrhina torquata beetles has been achieved during experiments funded by the Defence Advanced Research Projects Agency (DARPA). The weight of the electronics and battery meant that only Mecynorrhina was strong enough to fly freely under radio control. A specific series of pulses sent to the optic lobes of the insect encouraged it to take flight. The average length of flights was just 45 seconds, although one lasted for more than 30 minutes. A single pulse caused the beetle to land again. Stimulation of basilar flight muscles allowed the controller to direct the insect left or right, although this was successful on only 75% of stimulations. After each maneuver, the beetles quickly righted themselves and continued flying parallel to the ground. In 2015, researchers was able to fine tune the beetle steering in flight by changing the pulse train applied on the wing-folding muscle. Recently, scientists from Nanyang Technological University, Singapore, have demonstrated graded turning and backward walking in a small darkling beetle (Zophobas morio), which is 2 cm to 2.5 cm long and weight only 1 g including the electronic backpack and battery. It has been suggested the beetles could be used for search and rescue mission, however, it has been noted that currently available batteries, solar cells and piezoelectrics that harvest energy from movement cannot provide enough power to run the electrodes and radio transmitters for very long.

=== Moths ===
- Ananthaswamy, Anil (8 February 2012). "Nerve probe controls cyborg moth in flight". New Scientist.
- Coxworth, Ben (20 August 2014). "Scientists developing remote-control cyborg moths". New Atlas.
- "Remote-Controlled Cockroaches and Moths". Entomology Today. Entomological Society of America. 28 August 2013.

=== Drosophila ===
Work using Drosophila has dispensed with stimulating electrodes and developed a 3-part remote control system that evokes action potentials in pre-specified Drosophila neurons using a laser beam. The central component of the remote control system is a Ligand-gated ion channel gated by ATP. When ATP is applied, uptake of external calcium is induced and action potentials generated. The remaining two parts of the remote control system include chemically caged ATP, which is injected into the central nervous system through the fly's simple eye, and laser light capable of uncaging the injected ATP. The giant fibre system in insects consists of a pair of large interneurons in the brain which can excite the insect flight and jump muscles. A 200 ms pulse of laser light elicited jumping, wing flapping, or other flight movements in 60%–80% of the flies. Although this frequency is lower than that observed with direct electrical stimulation of the giant fibre system, it is higher than that elicited by natural stimuli, such as a light-off stimulus.

== Fish ==
=== Sharks ===
Spiny dogfish sharks have been remotely controlled by implanting electrodes deep in the shark's brain to a remote control device outside the tank. When an electric current is passed through the wire, it stimulates the shark's sense of smell and the animal turns, just as it would move toward blood in the ocean. Stronger electrical signals—mimicking stronger smells—cause the shark to turn more sharply. One study is funded by a $600,000 grant from Defense Advanced Research Projects Agency (DARPA). It has been suggested that such sharks could search hostile waters with sensors that detect explosives, or cameras that record intelligence photographs. Outside the military, similar sensors could detect oil spills or gather data on the behaviour of sharks in their natural habitat. Scientists working with remote control sharks admit they are not sure exactly which neurons they are stimulating, and therefore, they can't always control the shark's direction reliably. The sharks only respond after some training, and some sharks don't respond at all. The research has prompted protests from bloggers who allude to remote controlled humans or horror films featuring maniacal cyborg sharks on a feeding frenzy.

An alternative technique was to use small gadgets attached to the shark's noses that released squid juice on demand.

== Reptiles ==
=== Turtles ===
Video of a remote controlled turtle

South Korean researchers have remotely controlled the movements of a turtle using a completely non-invasive steering system. Red-eared terrapins (Trachemys scripta elegans) were made to follow a specific path by manipulating the turtles' natural obstacle avoidance behaviour. If these turtles detect something is blocking their path in one direction, they move to avoid it. The researchers attached a black half cylinder to the turtle. The "visor" was positioned around the turtle's rear end, but was pivoted around using a microcontroller and a servo motor to either the left or right to partially block the turtle's vision on one side. This made the turtle believe there was an obstacle it needed to avoid on that side and thereby encouraged the turtle to move in the other direction.

=== Geckos ===
Some animals have had parts of their bodies remotely controlled, rather than their entire bodies. Researchers in China stimulated the mesencephalon of geckos (G. gecko) via micro stainless steel electrodes and observed the gecko's responses during stimulation. Locomotion responses such as spinal bending and limb movements could be elicited in different depths of mesencephalon. Stimulation of the periaqueductal gray area elicited ipsilateral spinal bending while stimulation of the ventral tegmental area elicited contralateral spinal bending.

== Birds ==
=== Pigeons ===
In 2007, researchers at east China's Shandong University of Science and Technology implanted micro electrodes in the brain of a pigeon so they could remotely control it to fly right or left, or up or down.

== Uses and justification ==
Remote-controlled animals are considered to have several potential uses, replacing the need for humans in some dangerous situations. Their application is further widened if they are equipped with additional electronic devices. Small creatures fitted with cameras and other sensors have been proposed as being useful when searching for survivors after a building has collapsed, with cockroaches or rats being small and maneuverable enough to go under rubble.

There have been a number of suggested military uses of remote controlled animals, particularly in the area of surveillance. Remote-controlled dogfish sharks have been likened to the studies into the use of military dolphins. It has also been proposed that remote-controlled rats could be used for the clearing of land mines. Other suggested fields of application include pest control, the mapping of underground areas, and the study of animal behaviour.

Development of robots that are capable of performing the same actions as controlled animals is often technologically difficult and cost-prohibitive. Flight is very difficult to replicate while having an acceptable payload and flight duration. Harnessing insects and using their natural flying ability gives significant improvements in performance. The availability of "inexpensive, organic substitutes" therefore allows for the development of small, controllable robots that are otherwise currently unavailable.

== Similar applications ==
Some animals are remotely controlled, but rather than being directed to move left or right, the animal is prevented from moving forward, or its behaviour is modified in other ways.

=== Shock collars ===
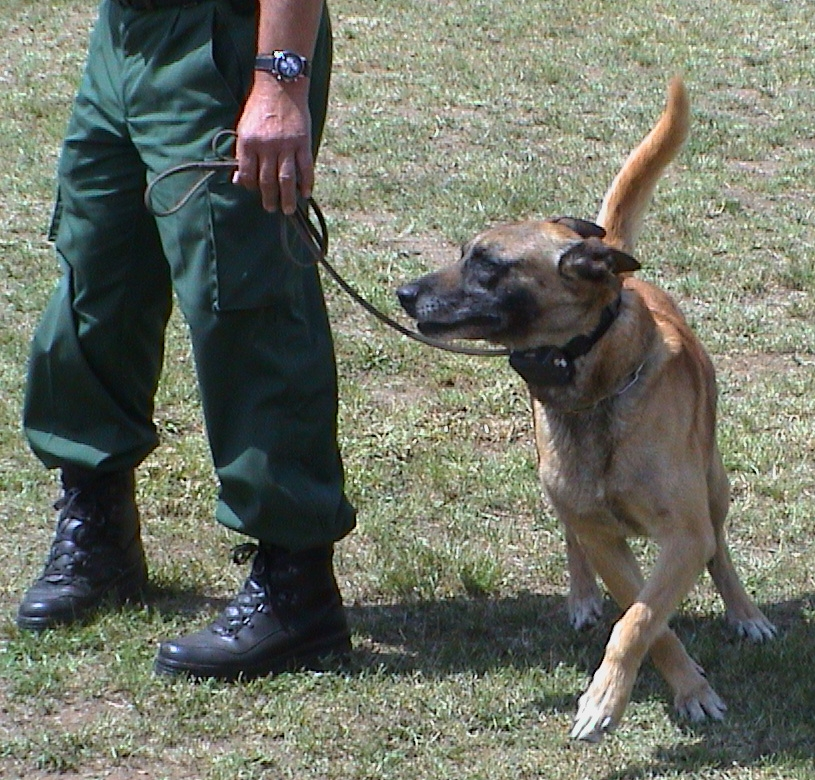
A dog wearing a shock collar

Shock collars deliver electrical shocks of varying intensity and duration to the neck or other area of a dog's body via a radio-controlled electronic device incorporated into a dog collar. Some collar models also include a tone or vibration setting, as an alternative to or in conjunction with the shock. Shock collars are now readily available and have been used in a range of applications, including behavioural modification, obedience training, and pet containment, as well as in military, police and service training. While similar systems are available for other animals, the most common are the collars designed for domestic dogs.

The use of shock collars is controversial and scientific evidence for their safety and efficacy is mixed. A few countries have enacted bans or controls on their use. Some animal welfare organizations warn against their use or actively support a ban on their use or sale. Some want restrictions placed on their sale. Some professional dog trainers and their organizations oppose their use and some support them. Support for their use or calls for bans from the general public is mixed.

=== Invisible fences ===
In 2007, it was reported that scientists at the Commonwealth Scientific and Industrial Research Organisation had developed a prototype "invisible fence" using the Global Positioning System (GPS) in a project nicknamed Bovines Without Borders. The system uses battery-powered collars that emit a sound to warn cattle when they are approaching a virtual boundary. If a cow wanders too near, the collar emits a warning noise. If it continues, the cow gets an electric shock of 250-milliwatts . The boundaries are drawn by GPS and exist only as a line on a computer. There are no wires or fixed transmitters at all. The cattle took less than an hour to learn to back off when they heard the warning noise. The scientists indicated that commercial units were up to 10 years away.

Another type of invisible fence uses a buried wire that sends radio signals to activate shock collars worn by animals that are "fenced" in. The system works with three signals. The first is visual (white plastic flags spaced at intervals around the perimeter in the fenced-in area), the second is audible (the collar emits a sound when the animal wearing it approaches buried cable), and finally there's an electric shock to indicate they have reached the fence.

Other invisible fences are wireless. Rather than using a buried wire, they emit a radio signal from a central unit, and activate when the animal travels beyond a certain radius from the unit.

== See also ==
- Animal rights
- Brain implant
- Cruelty to animals
- Microbotics
- Necrobotics
- Optogenetics
- Surveillance tools
