= Wastewater surveillance =

Monitoring wastewater for contaminants

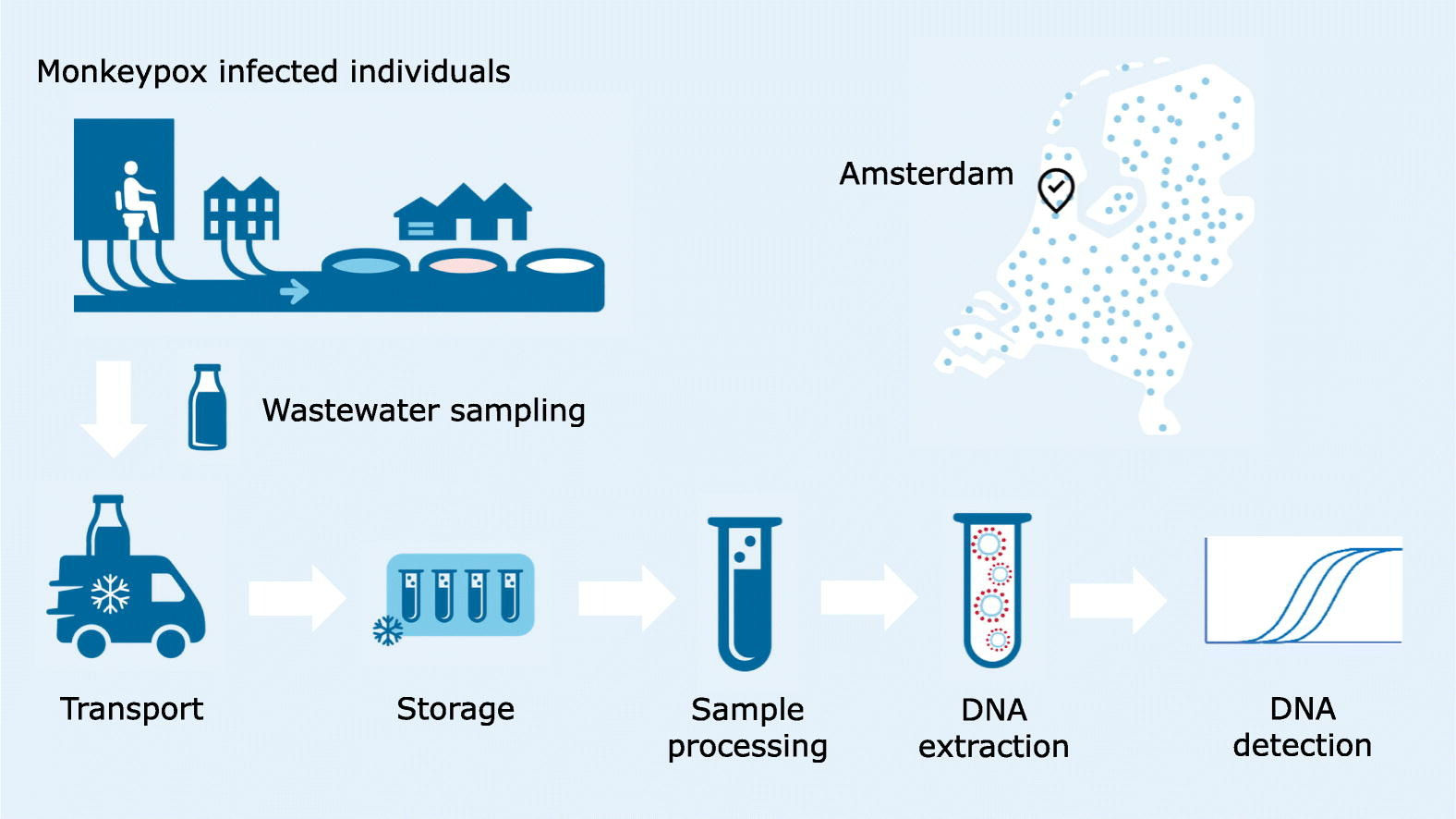
Wastewater sampling flowchart

Wastewater surveillance is the process of monitoring wastewater for contaminants. Amongst other uses, it can be used for biosurveillance, to detect the presence of pathogens in local populations, detection of new pathogen mutations and variants by genomic sequencing, and to detect the presence of psychoactive drugs.

CDC states that wastewater monitoring can help identify outbreak trends early and provide a broader picture of disease spread in a community when used alongside clinical and other public health surveillance data. Wastewater surveillance has also been explored for antimicrobial resistance monitoring from a One Health perspective. A 2025 review in the journal One Health described wastewater treatment plants as a point of intersection between humans, animals and the environment, making them useful for antimicrobial resistance surveillance.

== One Health relevance ==
Wastewater surveillance is relevant to the One Health framework because it links environmental monitoring with population-level public health surveillance. CDC states that wastewater monitoring can help identify outbreak trends early and provide information that complements other public health surveillance data. WHO has described wastewater and environmental surveillance as part of integrated surveillance for one or more pathogens.

A 2024 Nature Communications article argued that wastewater testing could help support a more global One Health disease surveillance approach. A 2025 review in One Health also described wastewater systems as a point of intersection between humans, animals and the environment for antimicrobial resistance surveillance.

The One Health perspective also emphasizes that wastewater surveillance should reflect local environmental conditions and infrastructure, since differences across communities can affect how surveillance is carried out and how findings are interpreted.

=== Zoonotic disease surveillance ===
Wastewater surveillance has been increasingly explored as a method for monitoring zoonotic diseases, which are infections transmitted between animals and humans. Because many zoonotic pathogens are excreted in human and animal waste, wastewater systems can serve as aggregated indicators of pathogen circulation within a population.

Within a One Health framework, wastewater treatment systems represent convergence points for human, animal, and environmental inputs. Zoonotic pathogens may enter wastewater through multiple pathways, including human excretion, agricultural runoff, and animal waste contamination.

Studies have shown that wastewater-based epidemiology can detect pathogen signals prior to increases in clinically reported cases, supporting its role as an early warning system for emerging zoonotic threats.

In addition to outbreak detection, wastewater surveillance has been applied to monitor a range of infectious agents and antimicrobial resistance, further supporting its integration into global One Health surveillance strategies.

== Surveillance during COVID-19 ==
One example of this is the use of wastewater monitoring to detect the presence of the SARS-CoV-2 virus in populations during the COVID-19 pandemic. In one study, wastewater surveillance showed signs of SARS-CoV-2 RNA before any cases were detected in the local population.

Later in the pandemic, wastewater surveillance was demonstrated to be one technique to detect SARS-CoV-2 variants and to monitor their prevalence over time. Comparison between case based epidemiological records and deep-sequenced wastewater samples validated that the composition of the virus population in the wastewater is in strong agreement with the virus variants circulating in the infected population. Following the 2022–23 reopening surge of COVID-19 cases in China, airplane wastewater surveillance began to be employed as a less intrusive method of monitoring for potential variants of concern arising within specific countries and regions.

At the request of the US Centers for Disease Control, the National Academies of Sciences, Engineering, and Medicine revealed, in a January 2023 report, its vision for a national wastewater surveillance system. Such a system would, according to the report committee, remove geographical inequities in the identification of future SARS-CoV-2 variants, influenza strains, antibiotic resistant bacteria, and other potential threats. Nationwide wastewater surveillance would likewise be combined with wastewater collection at other early-warning "sentinel sites", such as zoos and international airports.

The European Union identified wastewater surveillance as "a cost effective, rapid and reliable source of information on the spread of SARS-CoV-2 in the population and that it can form a valuable part of an increased genomic and epidemiological surveillance" and proposes to extend the urban wastewater surveillance to poliovirus, influenza, emerging pathogens, contaminants of emerging concern, antimicrobial resistance and any other public health parameters that are considered relevant by the Member States.

== See also ==
- Wastewater-based epidemiology
- One Health
