= Koniku =

American Biotech company

- Type: Private
- Industry: Technology
- Founded: 2015
- Headquarters: San Rafael, California, U.S
- Area served: Worldwide
- Key people: Osh Agabi (Founder, CEO, CTO)
- Products: Konikore
- Website: Koniku

Koniku is a California-based tech company. The company is known to develop hybrid "wetware" devices which integrate live biological neurons with silicon-based hardware. Koniku was known for its flagship product, the Konikore, an electronic olfaction system or "smell cyborg" unveiled at TEDGlobal 2017 in Tanzania.

The Konikore made in engineered biological neurons with olfactory receptors to detect and classify complex odors, chemical signatures, and explosives. The Konikore system applications included security, healthcare, and industry. Koniku partnered with Airbus since 2017 to develop threat detection systems for aviation. In 2025, the company became a founding member of the Oracle Defense Ecosystem established by Oracle Corporation.

== History ==
Koniku was founded in 2015 by Osh Agabi. The company’s name, Koniku, means “immortal” in Yoruba language.

The concept behind the company originated in 2003 while Osh Agabi was working at ETH Zurich with Professor Henry Baltes on the IMPLO Project. The research led to the development of IMPLO chips, which were later commercialized. Agabi subsequently continued related research at Imperial College London, focusing on the idea of building computing systems using biological neurons.

In 2016, Agabi secured funding that enabled him to establish Koniku in Silicon Valley, California. Koniku, Neuro-computing company set out a staged technological roadmap to embodied brain-based technologies that began with developing biological sensing systems, followed by control systems, and then cognition systems.

In 2017, Koniku secured first contract with Airbus valued at $8 million to develop biological threat-detection systems for aviation security. In 2018, the company introduced Konikore, a sensing device designed to detect chemical compounds through neuron-silicon hybrid sensors, as a Business-to-business product. Konikore was previously unveiled by Osh Agabi at TEDGlobal conference as a "smell cyborg".

During the COVID-19 pandemic, Koniku conducted clinical testing of its sensing technology for virus detection with Treximo and the University of Southern Nevada. The company raised further investment from investors, including SoftBank.

== Technology ==
Koniku’s flagship device, the Konikore, reportedly to be engineered with biological cells to identify odors in real time. Konikore operated by programming neurons with specific receptors that naturally bind to targeted substances. A subset of “reporter neurons” forms a biological electronic interface through endocytosis, creating the functional connection that allows electrical signals to be read by the chip. It seems the system links biological sensing to digital signal processing.

According to founder Osh Agabi, in 2020, the system was using the same olfactory mechanisms found in the noses of animals, such as dogs, to sense compounds in real time. In 2020, reportedly Konikore was able to identify over 4,000 compounds, and was used in applications ranging from food authentication and flavor analysis to agriculture, disease detection, and chemical sensing. The company's stated long-term goal was to digitize all real-world smell data and open access via the Koniku Technology Integrator Ecosystem (KTIE).

== Application ==
=== Security and Aviation ===
Since 2017, according to reports, Koniku partnered with Airbus to develop a system for detecting chemical, explosive, and biological threats in aircraft and at airports. In 2020, this collaboration expanded to include biological hazard detection, especially following the COVID-19 pandemic. In 2022, Airbus Americas joined Koniku’s Technology Integrator Ecosystem (KTIE) to co-develop the Konikore by Airbus system. The technology was reported to be deployed at the San Francisco International Airport and various locations in the Gulf States. In 2025, Koniku became a founding member of the Oracle Defense Ecosystem, a global defense initiative established by Oracle that uses Oracle Cloud.

=== Health and Industry ===
Koniku also used its smell processor for disease diagnostics, in 2020 it said it was aiming to convert domestic spaces like bathrooms into healthcare data centers capable of streaming smell data directly to the cloud. During the COVID-19 pandemic, the Konikore system was involved in clinical trials with Treximo and the University of Southern Nevada in an attempt to secure emergency use authorization as a rapid COVID-19 detection test. Additionally, the technology was applied to food authentication, flavor analysis (including a deal with Anheuser-Busch InBev in 2021), and chemical sensing, such as detecting compounds like benzene and xylene for oil companies.

== Critics and reception ==
In 2020, Timothy Swager, a chemistry professor at the MIT, noted that achieving what Koniku aimed for was requiring “some technical miracle,”. Swager highlighted that integrating natural protein receptors with silicon circuits would be an extremely challenging task, and the complexity of living cells made them difficult to engineer.

== See also ==
- Wetware computer
- Artificial neural network
- Chemical computer
- Unconventional computing
- Biosensor
- Biological computing
- Machine olfaction
