= Semi-biotic systems =

Biological concept

Semi-biotic systems are systems that incorporate biologically derived components/modules – which could range from multi-protein complexes through DNA constructs to multi-cellular assemblies – and integrate them with synthetic components (e.g. microfabricated systems) to produce hybrid devices. One of the potential attractions of these hybrid devices is the possibility that they can be designed to exhibit higher degrees of adaptability and autonomy than is possible with solid-state devices. Examples include: artificial organelle-like systems that could accomplish the synthesis of complex biomacromolecules, or synthetic multi-cellular structures that incorporate specific sensing and reporting functionalities, such that they could be used in hybrid devices for chemical or biological agent sensing.

Semi-biotic systems is an emerging area of research within the broader area of Synthetic Biology. In the European community a programme entitled NEONUCLEI was funded under FP6 whose aim is to generate synthetic analogues of cell nuclei capable of sustaining transcription, in self-assembled systems comprising DNA, macromolecules (or nanoparticles), and lipids.

== See also ==
- Animat
- Hybrot
