= Neurocomputer =

Neurocomputer may refer to:

- Wetware computer, a computer made of living neurons
- Artificial neural network, a mathematical model designed to imitate the function of living nerve cells
