= Osh Agabi =

American bioengineer (born 1979)

Osh. Agabi
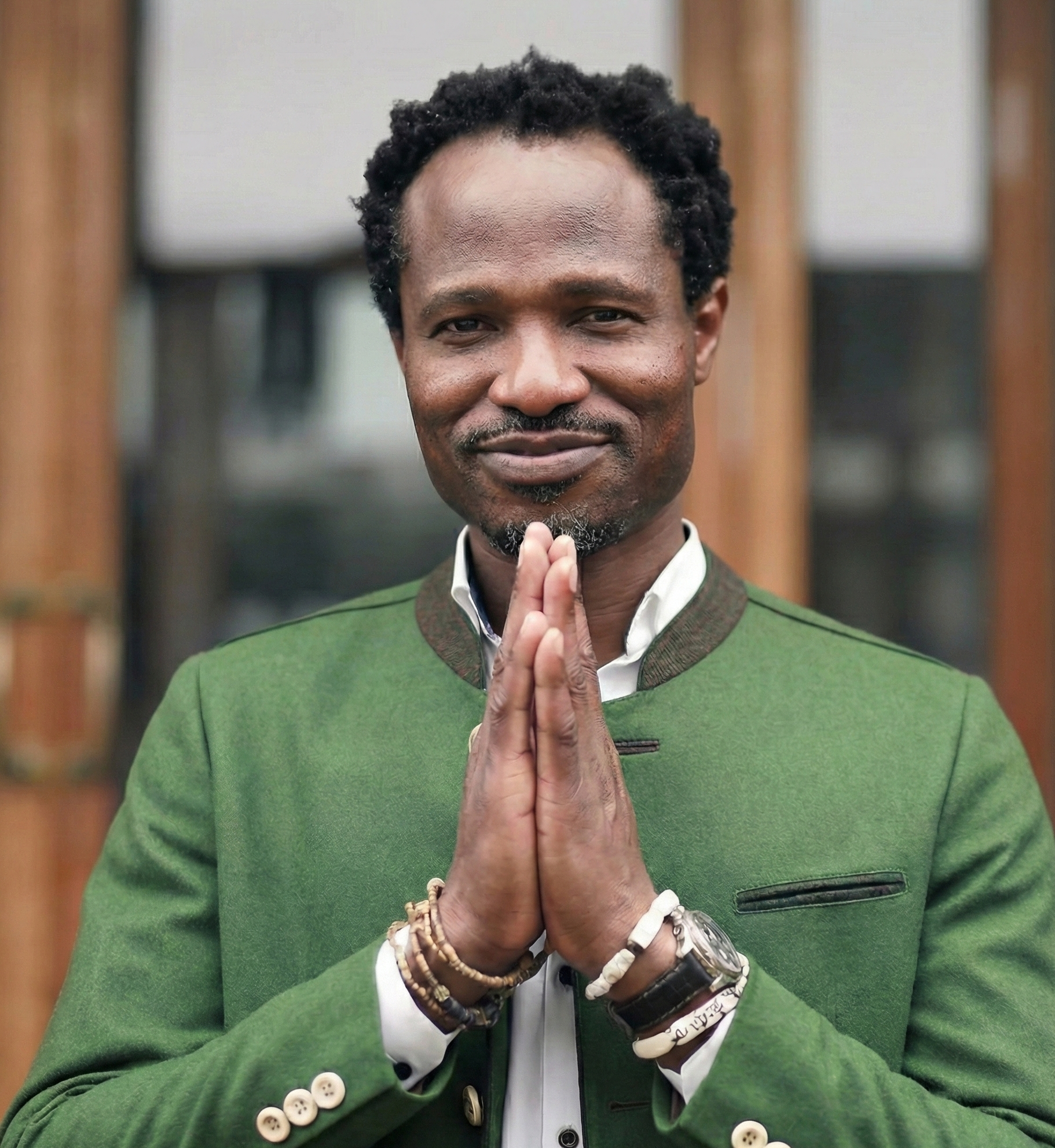
- Born: Oshiorenoya Eghierua Agabi; 1979 (age 46–47); Lagos, Nigeria
- Education: University of Lagos; Umeå University; ETH Zurich; Imperial College London
- Occupations: Research, Bioengineering and Entrepreneurship
- Years active: 2015- Present
- Known for: Bioengineering
- Notable work: Konikore
- Title: Founder and CEO at Koniku

Oshiorenoya Eghierua Agabi, simply referred to as Osh. (born 1979), is a Nigerian-Swiss-American physicist, computational neuroscientist, bioengineer, and entrepreneur.

Osh. is the CEO of Koniku Inc., a Silicon Valley-based synthetic biotechnology company he founded in 2015. Koniku Inc. designs and builds “smell cyborgs” or “smell processors” known as the Konikore. Konikore detects, analyzes, and outputs digital data concerning a wide range of smells. The underlying technology is a hybrid of bioengineered neurons and cells and FPGA technology.

Born and raised in Lagos, Nigeria, Osh. exhibited a keen interest in science from a young age. Osh. did his PhD studies in physics and computational neuroscience at the ETH Zürich in Switzerland. He also did a PhD in bioengineering with a focus on neuroengineering at Imperial College London in London. At the Koniku company, Osh.'s work is on the interaction between biology and technology. Konikore is reported to have gained interest from major companies including P&G, AB inBev, Exxon Mobil, Airbus, BASF, and Thermo Fisher Scientific, among others.

== Biography ==
Osh. was born in 1979, and grew up in Lawanson, a suburb of Surulere in Lagos, Nigeria. In 1997, Osh. attended his undergraduate studies at the University of Lagos, Nigeria, where he obtained a Bachelor of Sciences in Physics in 2001. Subsequently, he enrolled at Umeå University, Sweden, to pursue a post-graduate degree. Osh. graduated with a master's degree in physics in 2005. Osh. further enrolled at the ETH Zürich, Switzerland, to pursue PhD studies in physics and neuroscience; he left the ETH Zurich in 2010. He moved to Imperial College London in the UK the following year to work in the Department of Bioengineering until circa 2015, when he left Imperial College on a leave of absence to start Koniku Inc. in California.

== Career ==
=== Neuronics AG ===
In 2002, after graduating from the University of Lagos, Osh. was employed among the pioneers of Neuronics AG in Switzerland. Neuronics was an early pick-and-place robot company, founded by Hanruedi Fruh. The company spun out of the University of Zurich AI Lab, led by Rolf Pfeifer. At Neuronics, Osh. started working as a developer and was raised to program leader in 2005. He was responsible for programming robots with a statistical learning framework for the robot grippers to classify objects based on a heterogeneous sensor array. Osh served until the company was acquired in 2008.

== Academic career ==
At the University of Lagos, Osh's final year thesis was using PVDF (Polyvinylidene Fluoride or Polyvinylidene Difluoridee), a piezoelectric material to power body-worn or mobile electronic devices for energy. A subfield of energy harvesting. His final year thesis at Umea University was performed at the Physical Electronics Laboratory at the ETH Zurich Honggerberg Campus. The Physical Electronics Laboratory by Henry Baltes. Osh. was the first to apply the liquid state machines first proposed by Wolfgang Maass and Thomas Natschläger to biological neurons on CMO-based microelectrode arrays. The work has since been expanded by other researchers. During his joint PhD at the Swiss Federal Laboratories for Materials Science and Technology, Neuronics, and Institute of Neuroinformatics, Osh. led a team that successfully recreated the reflex arc on custom glass-based microelectrode arrays. The microelectrode array was an early demonstration of extensive surface functionalization of microelectrode arrays to support contractile muscle cells actively stimulated by spinal motor neurons with successful read out by dorsal root ganglion cells on the chip.

At Imperial College London, Osh. co-designed and built low cost (~$100K–$250K) two photon microscopes for brain imaging in the mouse visual cortex up to layer VI. He also worked on thalamocortical slices for monitoring signal transmission from the retina to the LGN and visual cortex in slices. Osh. also helped develop a system for recording electrical signals, fluorescence imaging, and optical imaging from the mouse brain, i.e., automated patch clamping in the mouse brain using AI. At Imperial College London, Osh. was a visiting scholar at MRC (London Institute of Medical Sciences, Hammersmith). He used two photon microscopes to understand neurodegenerative disorders in transgenic mice by evaluating PSD-95 puncta density in the cortex.

== Koniku ==
In 2015, Osh. co-founded Koniku Inc., a synthetic biotechnology company, based in California, US. Koniku was founded with the vision of building wetware chips that integrate biological neurons with silicon. The company strategy appears to aim to build wetware neuron chips that process smell first but get progressively into Artificial General Intelligence chips. The name of the company, Koniku, translates as “immortal” in Nigeria’s Yoruba language. Koniku claims the goal is digitizing all real-world smell data, regardless of source, making the data machine readable. The goal the company claims, its goal is to open up its data backend via Koniku Technology Integrator Ecosystem (KTIE) to other companies, developers, and the general public to build new products and applications. The smell processing of Koniku has applications in disease diagnostics; for example, Koniku aims to convert every home bathroom into a healthcare data center. The smell processor can directly stream all smell data to the cloud.

=== Konikore ===
Koniku's flagship product, the Konikore, is a sensory system that can detect and identify specific chemicals, including explosives and biological agents. Konikore's so-called “smell processor” consists of 3 units: the reader unit, which is essentially electronics and optical components; a biochip, which looks like an optic microfluidics device and is a consumable; and an onboard server, which allows remote addressing of each unit.

The biochip device looks like a cell-based array and has the footprint of a modem. It’s reported to house genetically altered neurons in a multi-well cell array style with physical demarcations. Some data indicates this is a full optical system relying on cell fluorescence rather than the more popular electrical readout from the cells as it has been reported in the past. It seems the optical system has the advantage of modularity; however, this advantage is unclear as the company has not made that information clear publicly. They seem to have filed patents for 3-dimensional electrical readouts as well.

Konikore was described as a smell cyborg and was unveiled during the 2017 TEDGlobal conference in Tanzania. The company said that it is capable of detecting and interpreting 4,096 different smells at the same time. Since its launch, the company seems to have deployed its technology at the San Francisco airport in California and other locations, especially in the Gulf States. The company also publicly unveiled the Konikore mounted on a quadruped robot at the 2024 Websummit conference in Doha, Qatar.

== Social contributions with Koniku ==
Since 2017, Koniku has had a partnership with Airbus, leveraging Airbus’ expertise in sensor integration and knowledge of ground and on-board security operations within the aviation and defense departments.

In 2019, Koniku Company was awarded second place in the Misk Global Forum Awards, which are organized by the Misk Foundation in Saudi Arabia. Subsequently, Koniku entered into discussions with oil companies in Saudi Arabia to integrate Konikore into detecting benzene, toluene, ethylene, and xylene.

In 2021, Koniku made a deal with Anheuser-Busch InBev to deploy the Konikore in measuring how a beverage's aromatic notes are perceived and experienced by the nose, to enhance flavor.

During the COVID-19 pandemic, Konikore underwent clinical trials with Treximo, and the University of Southern Nevada aims to secure emergency use authorization as a rapid COVID-19 detection test.

== Personal life ==
Osh. is based in California, U.S. with his wife & 3 kids. He is reported to be an avid tent camper. He has extensive family links in the United States, Switzerland, United Kingdom, Ireland and Nigeria.

== Criticism ==
In 2020, Koniku Inc. had over 21 patents. The critics stated that the company was too focused on patents and less on scientific publishing. A point the company said it will address more in the future. Osh. fired back at these critics, saying that science has devolved into paper-pushing at the expense of real innovation.

== Recognitions ==
- 2015: Top prize Winner at MIT Global Startup Workshop.
- 2016: Data & AI Winner by Hello Tomorrow Summit.
- 2019: Second winner at the Misk Global Forum by Misk Foundation.
- 2020: Global Innovation Olympian in the World in 2050 Challenge.
