= Animat =

Artificial animal

Animat are artificial animals, including physical robots and virtual simulations. The animat model includes features of a simple animal capable of interacting with its environment. It is, therefore, designed to simulate the ability to associate certain signals from the environment within a learning phase that indicate a potential for cognitive structure. The term is a contraction of animal and materials.

Animat research, a subset of artificial life studies, become more popular following Rodney Brooks' seminal 1991 paper "Intelligence without representation".

== Development ==
The term was coined by S.W. Wilson in 1985, in "Knowledge growth in an artificial animal", published in the first Proceedings of an International Conference on Genetic Algorithms and Their Applications. Wilson's conceptualization built on the works of W.G. Walter, particularly his invention of the nuilt 2 three-wheeled sensor, propulsion motor for front-wheel drive vehicles. In Machina speculatrix, Walter introduced what can be described as a sub-animat, which chose actions based on needs and the sensory situation. A few rules were already introduced in this seminal work. There is, for instance, the linking of speeds of the two motors to the level of illumination. Norbert Wiener's theories postulated in the 1948 Cybernetics is also said to have inspired the simulation of animals, particularly the brain and behaviors of frogs (Rana computatrix), rats, and monkeys.

In its early conceptualization, the animats - was built as simple creatures and simulated behaviors, which pertain to genetic reproduction and natural selection. Wilson's animat, however, did not only interact with the environment but also learned from its "experience".

== Theories and applications ==
An example using the Animat model as proposed by Wilson is discussed at some length in chapter 9 of Stan Franklin's book, Artificial Minds. In this implementation, the animat is capable of independent learning about its environment through application and evolution of pattern-matching rules called "taxons".

In 2001, Thomas DeMarse performed studies on 'neurally controlled animat'. Another recent development was the successful demonstration by Holland and Reitman of a rule-adaptive animat that has an optimized rate of satisfaction of two distinct needs.

Alan H Goldstein has proposed that, because nanobiotechnology is in the process of creating real animal-materials, speculative use of this term should be discouraged and its application become purely phenomenological. Based on the Animat Test (contained in the reference "I, Nanobot.") any nonbiological material or entity that exhibits the minimum set of behaviors that define a life form is, de facto, an Animat. Goldstein's basic premise is that in the age of nanobiotechnology it is necessary to follow the chemistry and molecular engineering rather than watching for the emergence of some pre-conceived minimum level of 'intelligence' such as an artificial neural network capable of adaptive phenomena. Goldstein has cautioned that there is a serious disconnect between the fields of nanobiotechnology and A-life based on profound differences in scientific training, experimental systems, and the different sets of terminology (jargon) these two fields have produced. Nanobiotechnologists (really molecular engineers who work with both biological and nonbiological molecules) are generally not concerned with complex systems per se; even when they are building molecular interconnects between such systems, e.g. neuroelectronic splices. A-Life researchers mainly take a systems-level approach. The enormous transformative power of novel molecular engineering has the potential to create Animats, true nonbiological life forms, whose relatively simple behavior would not fit into most standard A-Life paradigms. As a result, Goldstein argues, the first Animats may come into being completely unrecognized by either scientific community.

Every two years, the Society of Adaptive Behaviour meets and produces a proceedings on this topic. This group also have a journal, Adaptive Behavior.

== See also ==
- Cultured neuronal networks
- Hybrot
