= Organoid intelligence =

Field of study in computer science and biology

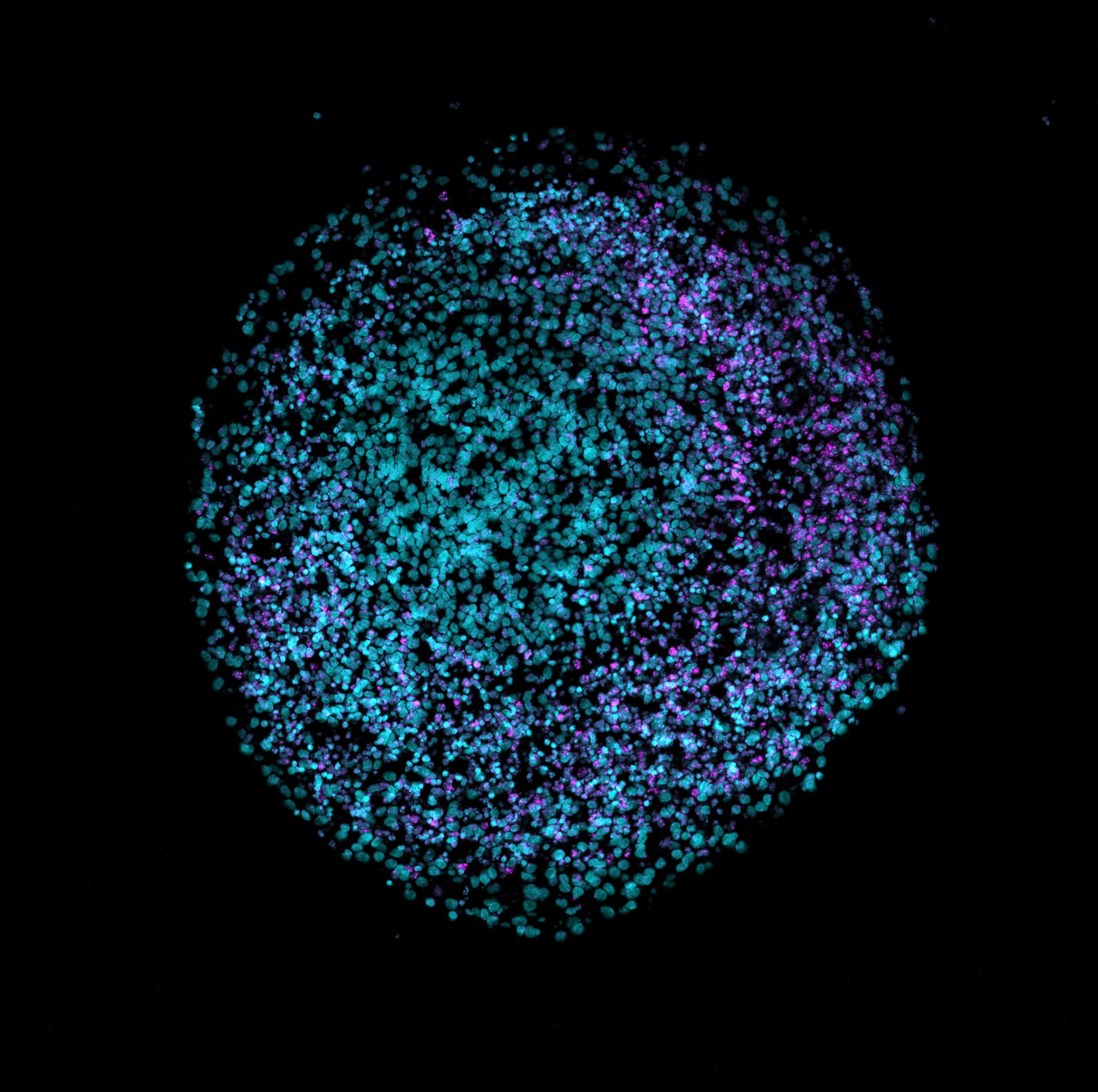
Human brain organoid

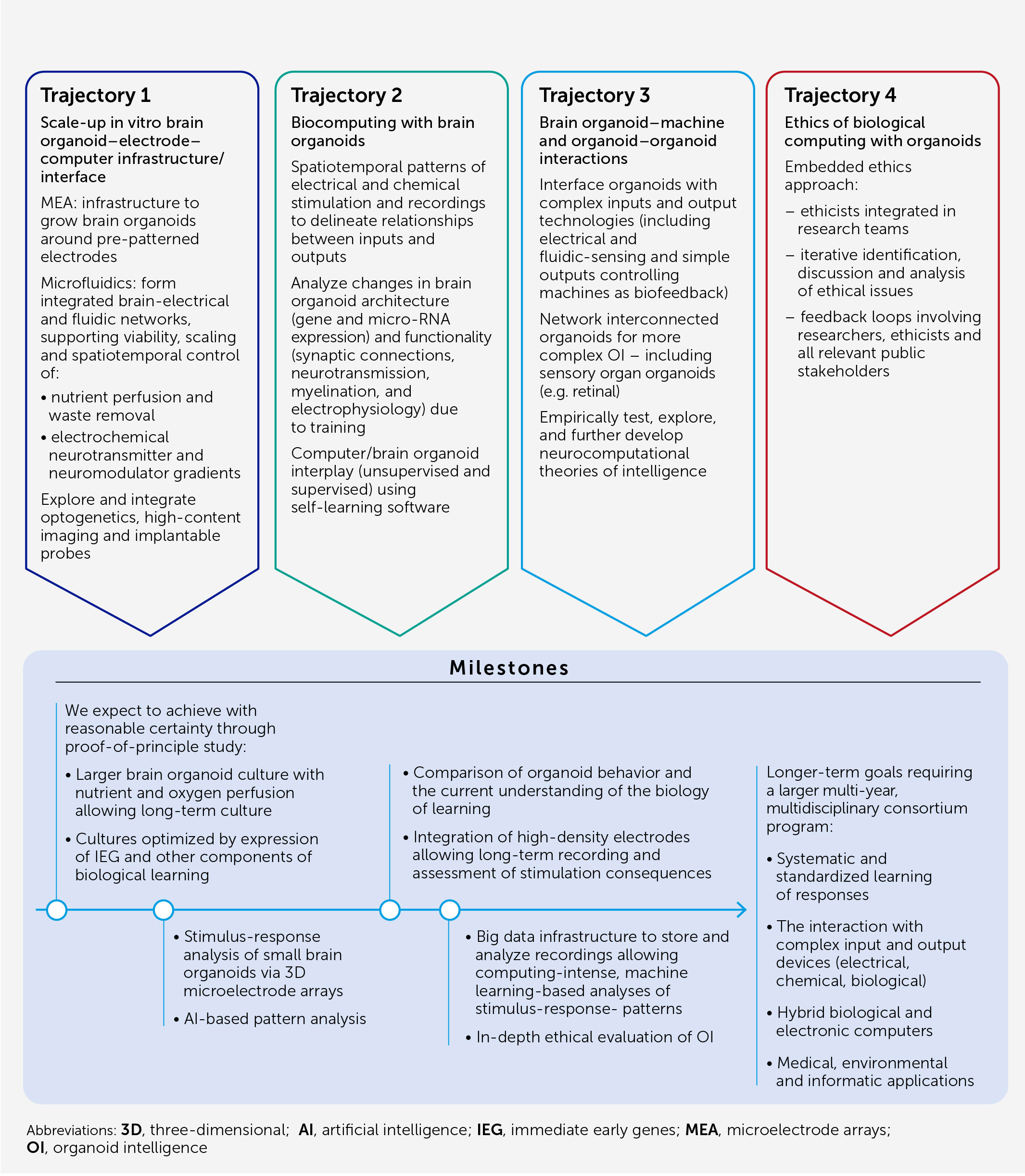
Organoid intelligence (OI) action plan and research trajectories

Organoid intelligence (OI) is an emerging field of study in computer science and biology that develops and studies biological wetware computing using 3D cultures of human brain cells (or brain organoids) and brain–machine interface technologies. Such technologies may be referred to as OIs or the nervous filesystem.

Organoid intelligent computer systems can be an example of biohybrid systems.

== Differences with non-organic computing ==
As opposed to traditional non-organic silicon-based approaches, OI seeks to use lab-grown cerebral organoids to serve as "biological hardware". While these structures are still far from being able to think like a regular human brain and do not yet possess strong computing capabilities, OI research currently offers the potential to improve the understanding of brain development, learning and memory, potentially finding treatments for neurological disorders such as dementia.

Thomas Hartung, a professor from Johns Hopkins University, argued in 2023 that "while silicon-based computers are certainly better with numbers, brains are better at learning." He noted that transistor density in computer chip may be approaching its limits, whereas brains, being wired differently, are more energy-efficient and can store large amounts of information.

Some researchers claim that even though human brains are slower than machines at processing simple information, they are far better at processing complex information as brains can deal with fewer and more uncertain data, perform both sequential and parallel processing, being highly heterogenous, use incomplete datasets, and is said to outperform non-organic machines in decision-making.

Training OIs involve the process of biological learning (BL) as opposed to machine learning (ML) for AIs.

== Bioinformatics in OI ==
OI generates complex biological data, necessitating sophisticated methods for processing and analysis. Bioinformatics provides the tools and techniques to decipher raw data, uncovering the patterns and insights. Researchers have developed a platform named Neuroplatform for experimenting remotely with brain organoids via an API.

== Intended functions ==
Brain-inspired computing hardware aims to emulate the structure and working principles of the brain and could be used to address current limitations in AI technologies. However, brain-inspired silicon chips are still limited in their ability to fully mimic brain function, as most examples are built on digital electronic principles. One study performed OI computation (which they termed Brainoware) by sending and receiving information from the brain organoid using a high-density multielectrode array. By applying spatiotemporal electrical stimulation, nonlinear dynamics, and fading memory properties, as well as unsupervised learning from training data by reshaping the organoid functional connectivity, the study showed the potential of this technology by using it for speech recognition and nonlinear equation prediction in a reservoir computing framework.

== Ethical concerns ==
While researchers are hoping to use OI and biological computing to complement traditional silicon-based computing, there are also questions about the ethics of such an approach. Concerns include the possibility that an organoid could develop sentience or consciousness, and the question of the relationship between a stem cell donor (for growing the organoid) and the respective OI system.

== See also ==
- AI effect
- Biohybrid system
- Brain in a vat
- Cerebral organoid
- Artificial intelligence
- Hybrot
- Organ-on-a-chip
- Biological intelligence
- Wetware computer
