= Cortical Labs =

Australian biological computing company

- Type: Private
- Industry: Biological Computing
- Founded: 2019
- Founder: Hon Weng Chong; Andy Kitchen
- Headquarters: Melbourne, Australia
- Key people: Brett Kagan (CEO/CSO)
- Number of employees: 28
- Website: https://corticallabs.com

Cortical Labs is an Australian biological computing company (also referred to as "wetware") founded in 2019 by Hon Weng Chong, and Andy Kitchen based in Melbourne. The company gained recognition in 2022 with the release of an academic paper describing "DishBrain", a collection of human neurons that were taught to play pong. The company later released their first commercial product, the CL1, a biological computer, in 2025. The company hopes that their technology can be a competitor to traditional AI due to the lower energy costs their systems require. They also can be used in the medical field for drug testing, tailoring drugs to individuals, and researching neurological conditions.

== Funding ==
After the company's founding in 2019 Cortical Labs raised a combined $1.56 million from investors such as Blackbird Ventures and January Capital. In April 2023 they raised $10 million in a funding round led by Horizons Ventures with LifeX Ventures, Blackbird Ventures, Radar Ventures and In-Q-Tel (which is associated with the CIA) also participating. They also received a grant of $245 thousand in 2026 through Australia's Industry Growth Program in order to prepare the CL1 and Cortical Cloud service for commercial release.

== Technology ==
=== DishBrain ===
In 2022 a research team, including Kagan and Kitchen, funded by Cortical Labs published a paper in Neuron describing the development "DishBrain", a collection of neurons grown in vitro that interacts with various electrodes in order to play Pong. DishBrain was made up of roughly 800,000 human neurons grown from stem cells. These neurons were then attached to electrodes, which relayed information about the position of the paddles and ball in the game. The neuron cultures were trained in accordance with the free energy principle, a theory that suggests the brain seeks to reduce uncertainty. Thus to train Dishbrain mistakes (missing the ball) caused random stimulus and successes (hitting the ball) caused ordered stimulus.

Along with cultures of human neurons The research also grew mouse neurons and compared results between the two species. It was shown that the human cells achieved longer rally lengths in the same amount of training time compared to the mouse cells.

=== CL1 ===
The CL1 (Cortical Lab's first commercial product) was announced in March 2025 at a price of $35,000. The CL1 was shipped out in the summer of the same year. The CL1 is the "world's first code-deployable biological computer" with buyers being able to deploy code directly to the neurons. Similar to DishBrain the CL1 is made up of roughly 800,000 human neurons placed on a grid of 59 electrodes serving as inputs, along with life support systems to provide the cells with nutrients. The neurons are derived from pluripotent stem cells created from skin or blood cells donated by volunteers (including Chong himself). These neurons were advertised as lasting "up to 6 months" however Kagan claims that some cells were successfully maintained for up to a year. A 30-unit rack consumes 850 to 1000 watts, far less than traditional AI data centres. The CL1 also cut latency to less than a millisecond compared to the 5 millisecond latency of DishBrain.

Along with the CL1 the Cortical Cloud was released as a cloud-based "wetware as a service" model that allowed scientists access to in house cultures for a price of $300 a week. The cells can be programmed using Python. The API was used by independent researcher Sean Cole to teach roughly 200,000 cortical cells to play "Freedoom" (a copyright-free game produced in the Doom engine) in a week with no previous experience working with neurons.

In August 2026 DayOne launched a biological data center prototype in Singapore made up of 20 CL1 units in partnership with Cortical Labs and the NUS Yong Loo Lin School of Medicine.

== Ethics ==
Cortical labs has faced many ethical questions regarding whether the organoid brains are, or will become, conscious. While DishBrain is described as sentient in the original paper, this only refers to the way it can react to its environment, not its capability for feelings or sensations as the term is commonly used. However some have stated that its ability to react to its environment may mean that it is capable of suffering and therefore moral limits on how they can be used should be put in place. Both Chong and Kagan state that Cortical Labs is working closely with bioethicists in order to ensure the organoids will not become conscious. Cortical Labs have published a number of journal articles together with world-leading ethicists and scientists such as Julian Savulescu, Lomax Boyd, Brett Kagan and Alon Loeffler, discussing the ethical implications of biological computing and synthetic neural systems. Labs purchasing the CL1 are also required to meet ethical standards, including having ethical approval for generating cell lines.
