= Neurally controlled animat =

Robot controlled by neuronal network

A neurally controlled animat is the conjunction of

1. a cultured neuronal network
2. a virtual or physical robotic body, the Animat, "living" in a virtual computer generated environment or in a physical arena, connected to this array

Patterns of neural activity are used to control the virtual body, and the computer is used as a sensory device to provide electrical feedback to the neural network about the Animat's movement in the virtual environment.

The current aim of the Animat research is to study the neuronal activity and plasticity when learning and processing information in order to find a mathematical model for the neural network, and to determine how information is processed and encoded in the rat cortex.

It leads towards interesting questions about consciousness theories as well.

== See also ==
- Remote control animal

== Bibliography ==
- T. B., Demarse, D. A. Wagenaar, A. W. Blau and S. M. Potter, ‘Neurally controlled computer-simulated animals: a new tool for studying learning and memory in vitro’ in Society for Neuroscience Annual Meeting, (2000) SFN ID: 2961.
- T. B., Demarse, D. A. Wagenaar, A. W. Blau and S. M. Potter, (2001). ‘The neurally controlled Animat: biological brains acting with simulated bodies’. Autonomous Robots no.11, pp.305–310
