= Alan H. Goldstein =

Alan H. Goldstein is a research scientist and futurist.

He began his career in the 1970s as a molecular biologist before becoming a theoretician in the field of nanobiotechnology. He has codified the central concepts of this nascent area of knowledge into a set of operational rules termed the 'Laws of Biomimetics'. As part of this work, Goldstein has published a set of guidelines specifically designed to identify the artificial life forms likely to emerge from research at the intersection of nanotechnology and biotechnology. He has also created the 'Animat Test' as a practical bioengineering tool for monitoring the coming transformation from natural to artificial biology:

Let us define a life form as an entity that reduces entropy by self-executing the minimum set of physical and chemical operations necessary to sustain the ability to execute functionally equivalent negentropic operations indefinitely across time. Given that, a life form will be considered an animat (living material) if all the information necessary to execute that minimum set of physical and chemical operations cannot be stored in DNA or RNA. The corollary: If all the information necessary to execute that minimum set of physical and chemical operations can be stored in DNA or RNA, the life form is biological.

His essay "Nature vs. Nanoengineering: Rebuilding our world one atom at a time." won a 2003 Shell-Economist Prize http://www.shelleconomistprize.com and remains the primary reference in the nascent field of nanobioethics. He was probably the first person to use the term "Breaking The Carbon Barrier" to identify the future moment when humanity successfully engineers the first nonbiological life form. This concept was formally introduced and defined during a debate with Ron Bailey at the Foresight 'Vision Weekend' component of the 13th Foresight Conference on Advanced Nanotechnology.
