= Cultured neuronal network =

Cell culture of neurons

A cultured neuronal network is a cell culture of neurons that is used as a model to study the central nervous system, especially the brain. Often, cultured neuronal networks are connected to an input/output device such as a multi-electrode array (MEA), thus allowing two-way communication between the researcher and the network. This model has proved to be an invaluable tool to scientists studying the underlying principles behind neuronal learning, memory, plasticity, connectivity, and information processing.

Cultured neurons are often connected via computer to a real or simulated robotic component, creating a hybrot or animat, respectively. Researchers can then thoroughly study learning and plasticity in a realistic context, where the neuronal networks are able to interact with their environment and receive at least some artificial sensory feedback. One example of this can be seen in the Multielectrode Array Art (MEART) system developed by the Potter Research Group at the Georgia Institute of Technology in collaboration with SymbioticA, The Centre for Excellence in Biological Art, at the University of Western Australia. Another example can be seen in the neurally controlled animat.

== Use as a model ==
=== Advantages ===
The use of cultured neuronal networks as a model for their in vivo counterparts has been an indispensable resource for decades. It allows researchers to investigate neuronal activity in a much more controlled environment than would be possible in a live organism. Through this mechanism researchers have gleaned important information about the mechanisms behind learning and memory.

A cultured neuronal network allows researchers to observe neuronal activity from several vantage points. Electrophysiological recording and stimulation can take place either across the network or locally via an MEA, and the network development can be visually observed using microscopy techniques. Moreover, chemical analysis of the neurons and their environment is more easily accomplished than in an in vivo setting.

=== Disadvantages ===
Cultured neuronal networks are by definition disembodied cultures of neurons. Thus by being outside their natural environment, the neurons are influenced in ways that are not biologically normal. Foremost among these abnormalities is the fact that the neurons are usually harvested as neural stem cells from a fetus and are therefore disrupted at a critical stage in network development. When the neurons are suspended in solution and subsequently dispensed, the connections previously made are destroyed and new ones formed. Ultimately, the connectivity (and consequently the functionality) of the tissue is changed from what the original template suggested.

Another disadvantage lies in the fact that the cultured neurons lack a body and are thus severed from sensory input as well as the ability to express behavior – a crucial characteristic in learning and memory experiments. It is believed that such sensory deprivation has adverse effects on the development of these cultures and may result in abnormal patterns of behavior throughout the network.

Cultured networks on traditional MEAs are flat, single-layer sheets of cells with connectivity only two dimensions. Most in vivo neuronal systems, to the contrary, are large three-dimensional structures with much greater interconnectivity. This remains one of the most striking differences between the model and the reality, and this fact probably plays a large role in skewing some of the conclusions derived from experiments based on this model.

== Growing a neuronal network ==
=== Neurons used ===
Because of their wide availability, neuronal networks are typically cultured from dissociated rat neurons. Studies commonly employ rat cortical, hippocampal, and spinal neurons, although lab mouse neurons have also been used. Currently, relatively little research has been conducted on growing primate or other animal neuronal networks. Harvesting neural stem cells requires sacrificing the developing fetus, a process considered too costly to perform on many mammals that are valuable in other studies.

One study, however, did make use of human neural stem cells grown into a network to control a robotic actuator. These cells were acquired from a fetus that spontaneously aborted after ten weeks in gestation.

=== Long-term culture ===
One of the most formidable problems associated with cultured neuronal networks is their lack of longevity. Like most cell cultures, neuron cultures are highly susceptible to infection. They are also susceptible to hyperosmolality from medium evaporation. The long timelines associated with studying neuronal plasticity (usually on the scale of months) makes extending the lifespan of neurons in vitro paramount.

One solution to this problem involves growing cells on an MEA inside a sealed chamber. This chamber serves as a non-humidified incubator that is enclosed by a fluorinated ethylene propylene (FEP) membrane that is permeable to select gases (i.e. gases necessary for metabolism) but impermeable to water and microbes. Other solutions entail an incubator with an impermeable membrane that has a specific mix of gases (air with 5% CO_{2} is typical) sealed inside.

=== Microelectrode arrays (MEAs) ===
A microelectrode array (MEA), also commonly called a multielectrode array, is a patterned array of electrodes laid out in a transparent substrate used for communication with neurons in contact with it. The communication can be, and usually is, bidirectional; researchers can both record electrophysiological data from a live network and stimulate it.

This device has been an essential biosensor for more than thirty years. It has been used not only in the study of neuronal plasticity and information processing but also in drug and toxin effects on neurons. Additionally, when coupled with a sealed incubation chamber this device greatly reduces the risk of culture contamination by nearly eliminating the need to expose it to air.

Currently, commonly used MEAs have relatively poor spatial resolution. They employ approximately sixty electrodes for recording and stimulation in varying patterns in a dish with a typical culture of 50,000 cells or more (or a density of 5,000 cells/mm^{2}). It follows that each electrode in the array services a large cluster of neurons and cannot provide resolute information regarding signal origin and destination; such MEAs are only capable of region-specific data acquisition and stimulation.

Ideally it would be possible to record and stimulate from a single or a few neurons at a time. Indeed, companies such as Axion Biosystems are working to provide MEAs with much higher spatial resolution to this end (a maximum of 768 input/output electrodes). Another study investigates establishing a stable one-to-one connection between neurons and electrodes. The goal was to meet the ideal interface situation by establishing a correspondence with every neuron in the network. They do so by caging individual neurons while still allowing the axons and dendrites to extend and make connections. Neurons are contained within neurocages or other sorts of containers, and the device itself could be referred to as the caged neuron MEA or neurochip.

Other research suggests alternative techniques to stimulating neurons in vitro. One study investigates the use of a laser beam to free caged compounds such as neurotransmitters and neuromodulators. A laser beam with wavelength in the UV spectrum would have extremely high spatial accuracy and, by releasing the caged compounds, could be used to influence a very select set of neurons.

== Network behavior ==
=== Spontaneous network activity ===
Spontaneous network bursts are a commonplace feature of neuronal networks both in vitro and in vivo. In vitro, this activity is particularly important in studies on learning and plasticity. Such experiments look intensely at the network-wide activity both before and after experiments in order to discern any changes that might implicate plasticity or even learning. However, confounding this experimental technique is the fact that normal neuronal development induces change in array-wide bursts that could easily skew data. In vivo, however, it has been suggested that these network bursts may form the basis for memories.

Depending on experimental perspective, network-wide bursts can be viewed either positively or negatively. In a pathological sense, spontaneous network activity can be attributed to the disembodiment of the neurons; one study saw a marked difference between array-wide firing frequency in cultures that received continuous input versus those that did not. To eliminate aberrant activity, researchers commonly use magnesium or synaptic blockers to quiet the network. However, this approach has great costs; quieted networks have little capacity for plasticity due to a diminished ability to create action potentials. A different and perhaps more effective approach is the use of low frequency stimulation that emulates sensory background activity.

In a different light, network bursts can be thought of as benign and even good. Any given network demonstrates non-random, structured bursts. Some studies have suggested that these bursts represent information carriers, expression of memory, a means for the network to form appropriate connections, and learning when their pattern changes.

==== Array-wide burst stability ====
Stegenga et al. set out to establish the stability of spontaneous network bursts as a function of time. They saw bursts throughout the lifetime of the cell cultures, beginning at 4–7 days in vitro (DIV) and continuing until culture death. They gathered network burst profiles (BPs) through a mathematical observation of array-wide spiking rate (AWSR), which is the summation of action potentials over all electrodes in an MEA. This analysis yielded the conclusion that, in their culture of Wistar rat neocortical cells, the AWSR has long rise and fall times during early development and sharper, more intense profiles after approximately 25 DIV. However, the use of BPs has an inherent shortcoming; BPs are an average of all network activity over time, and therefore only contain temporal information. In order to attain data about the spatial pattern of network activity they developed what they call phase profiles (PPs), which contain electrode specific data.

Data was gathered using these PPs on timescales of milliseconds up through days. Their goal was to establish the stability of network burst profiles on the timescale of minutes to hours and to establish stability or developmental changes over the course of days. In summary, they were successful in demonstrating stability over minutes to hours, but the PPs gathered over the course of days displayed significant variability. These finding imply that studies of plasticity of neurons can only be conducted over the course of minutes or hours without bias in network activity introduced by normal development.

=== Learning vs. plasticity ===
There is much controversy in the field of neuroscience surrounding whether or not a cultured neuronal network can learn. A crucial step in finding the answer to this problem lies in establishing the difference between learning and plasticity. One definition suggests that learning is "the acquisition of novel behavior through experience". Corollary to this argument is the necessity for interaction with the environment around it, something that cultured neurons are virtually incapable of without sensory systems. Plasticity, on the other hand, is simply the reshaping of an existing network by changing connections between neurons: formation and elimination of synapses or extension and retraction of neurites and dendritic spines. But these two definitions are not mutually exclusive; in order for learning to take place, plasticity must also take place.

In order to establish learning in a cultured network, researchers have attempted to re-embody the dissociated neuronal networks in either simulated or real environments (see MEART and animat). Through this method the networks are able to interact with their environment and, therefore, have the opportunity to learn in a more realistic setting. Other studies have attempted to imprint signal patterns onto the networks via artificial stimulation. This can be done by inducing network bursts or by inputting specific patterns to the neurons, from which the network is expected to derive some meaning (as in experiments with animats, where an arbitrary signal to the network indicates that the simulated animal has run into a wall or is moving in a direction, etc.). The latter technique attempts to take advantage of the inherent ability of neuronal networks to make sense of patterns. However, experiments have had limited success in demonstrating a definition of learning that is widely agreed upon. Nevertheless, plasticity in neuronal networks is a phenomenon that is well-established in the neuroscience community, and one that is thought to play a very large role in learning.

== See also ==
- Artificial life
- Artificial neural networks
- Brain–computer interface
- CoDi
- Cybernetics
- Neural ensemble
- Neural engineering
- Neurally controlled animat
- Neuroscience
