= Wetware computer =

Computer composed of organic material

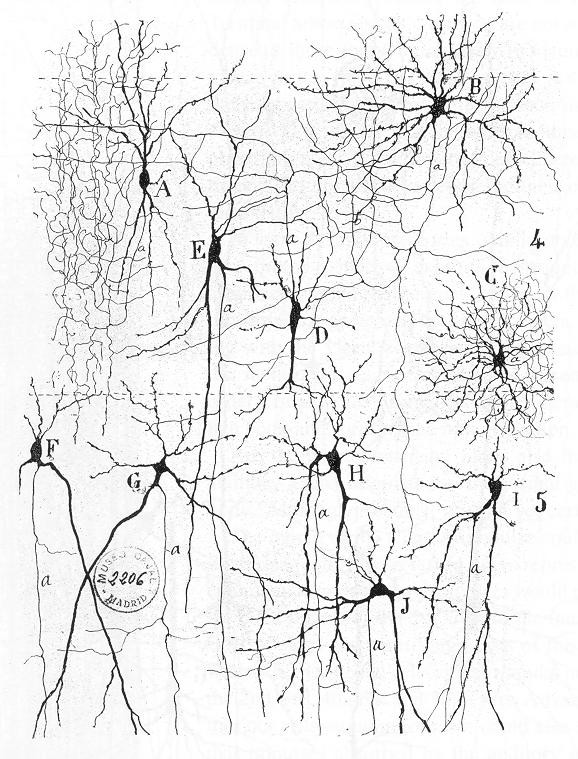
Diversity of neuronal morphologies in the auditory cortex

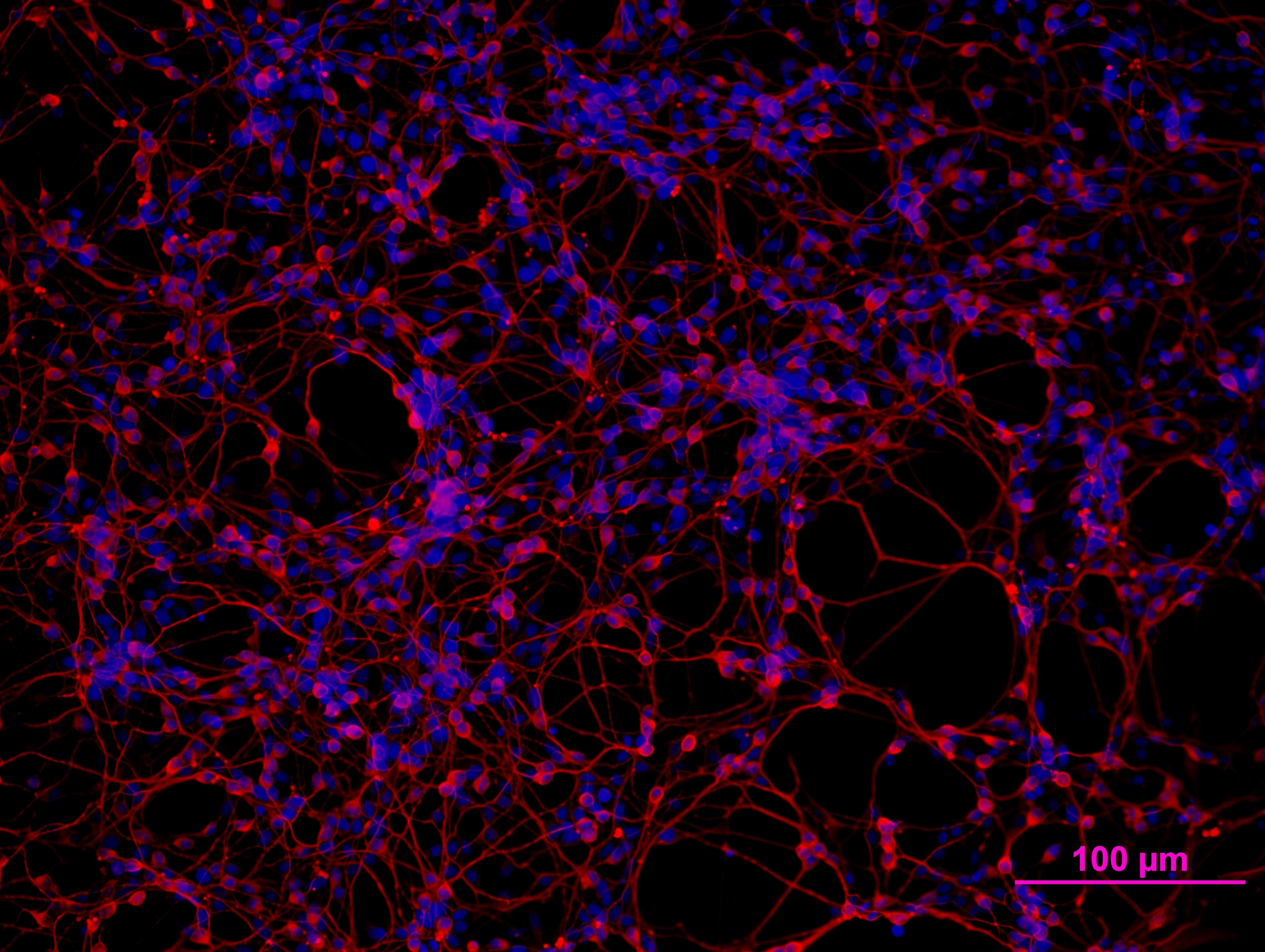
This image is of neural network cultured brain cells, highlighting connections between neurons. This structure reflects biological systems with Red stain highlighting neurites (axons and dendrites) and blue stain marks cell nuclei process information in wetware & organic computing.

A wetware computer is an organic computer (which can also be known as an artificial organic brain or a neurocomputer) composed of organic material "wetware" such as "living" neurons. Wetware computers composed of neurons are different than conventional computers because they use biological materials, and offer the possibility of substantially more energy-efficient computing. While a wetware computer is still largely conceptual, there has been limited success with construction and prototyping, which has acted as a proof of the concept's realistic application to computing in the future. The most notable prototypes have stemmed from the research completed by biological engineer William Ditto during his time at the Georgia Institute of Technology. His work constructing a simple neurocomputer capable of basic addition from leech neurons in 1999 was a significant discovery for the concept. This research was a primary example driving interest in creating these artificially constructed, but still organic brains.

== Origins and theoretical foundations ==
Theories of early biological computation borrowed from Alan Turing's morphogenesis model, which showed that chemical interactions could produce complex patterns without centralized control. Hopfield's associative memory networks also provided a foundation for biological information systems with fault tolerance and self-organization.

== Major characteristics and processes ==
Biological wetware systems demonstrate dynamic reconfigurability underpinned by neuroplasticity and enable continuous learning and adaptation. Reaction-diffusion-based computing and molecular logic gates allow spatially parallel information processing unachievable in conventional systems. These systems also show fault tolerance and self-repair at the cellular and network level. The development of cerebral organoids—miniature lab-grown brains—demonstrates spontaneous learning behavior and suggests biological tissue as a viable computational substrate.

== Overview ==
The concept of wetware is an application of specific interest to the field of computer manufacturing. Moore's law, which states that the number of transistors which can be placed on a silicon chip is doubled roughly every two years, has acted as a goal for the industry for decades, but as the size of computers continues to decrease, the ability to meet this goal has become more difficult, threatening to reach a plateau. Due to the difficulty in reducing the size of computers because of size limitations of transistors and integrated circuits, wetware provides an unconventional alternative. A wetware computer composed of neurons is an ideal concept because, unlike conventional materials which operate in binary (on/off), a neuron can shift between thousands of states, constantly altering its chemical conformation, and redirecting electrical pulses through over 200,000 channels in any of its many synaptic connections. Because of this large difference in the possible settings for any one neuron, compared to the binary limitations of conventional computers, the space limitations are far fewer.

== Background ==
The concept of wetware is distinct and unconventional and draws slight resonance with both hardware and software from conventional computers. While hardware is understood as the physical architecture of traditional computational devices, comprising integrated circuits and supporting infrastructure, software represents the encoded architecture of storage and instructions. Wetware is a separate concept that uses the formation of organic molecules, mostly complex cellular structures (such as neurons), to create a computational device such as a computer. In wetware, the ideas of hardware and software are intertwined and interdependent. The molecular and chemical composition of the organic or biological structure would represent not only the physical structure of the wetware but also the software, being continually reprogrammed by the discrete shifts in electrical pulses and chemical concentration gradients as the molecules change their structures to communicate signals. The responsiveness of a cell, proteins, and molecules to changing conformations, both within their structures and around them, ties the idea of internal programming and external structure together in a way that is alien to the current model of conventional computer architecture.

The structure of wetware represents a model where the external structure and internal programming are interdependent and unified; meaning that changes to the programming or internal communication between molecules of the device would represent a physical change in the structure. The dynamic nature of wetware borrows from the function of complex cellular structures in biological organisms. The combination of "hardware" and "software" into one dynamic, and interdependent system which uses organic molecules and complexes to create an unconventional model for computational devices is a specific example of applied biorobotics.

=== The cell as a model of wetware ===
Cells in many ways can be seen as their form of naturally occurring wetware, similar to the concept that the human brain is the preexisting model system for complex wetware. In his book Wetware: A Computer in Every Living Cell (2009) Dennis Bray explains his theory that cells, which are the most basic form of life, are just a highly complex computational structure, like a computer. To simplify one of his arguments a cell can be seen as a type of computer, using its structured architecture. In this architecture, much like a traditional computer, many smaller components operate in tandem to receive input, process the information, and compute an output. In an overly simplified, non-technical analysis, cellular function can be broken into the following components: Information and instructions for execution are stored as DNA in the cell, RNA acts as a source for distinctly encoded input, processed by ribosomes and other transcription factors to access and process the DNA and to output a protein. Bray's argument in favor of viewing cells and cellular structures as models of natural computational devices is important when considering the more applied theories of wetware to biorobotics.

=== Biorobotics ===
Wetware and biorobotics are closely related concepts, which both borrow from similar overall principles. A biorobotic structure can be defined as a system modeled from a preexisting organic complex or model such as cells (neurons) or more complex structures like organs (brain) or whole organisms. Unlike wetware, the concept of biorobotics is not always a system composed of organic molecules, but instead could be composed of conventional material which is designed and assembled in a structure similar or derived from a biological model. Biorobotics have many applications and are used to address the challenges of conventional computer architecture. Conceptually, designing a program, robot, or computational device after a preexisting biological model such as a cell, or even a whole organism, provides the engineer or programmer the benefits of incorporating into the structure the evolutionary advantages of the model.

== Effects on users ==
Wetware technologies such as BCIs and neuromorphic chips offer new possibilities for user autonomy. For those with disabilities, such systems could restore motor or sensory functions and enhance quality of life. However, these technologies raise ethical questions: cognitive privacy, consent over biological data, and risk of exploitation.

With the development of wetware devices, disparities in access could exacerbate social inequalities, benefiting those who have resources to enhance cognitive or physical abilities. It is necessary to create strong ethical frameworks, inclusive development practices, and open systems of governance to reduce risks and make sure that wetware advances are beneficial to all segments of society.

== Applications and goals ==
=== Basic neurocomputer composed of leech neurons ===
In 1999 William Ditto and his team of researchers at Georgia Institute of Technology and Emory University created a basic form of a wetware computer capable of simple addition by harnessing leech neurons. Leeches were used as a model organism due to the large size of their neuron, and the ease associated with their collection and manipulation. However, these results have never been published in a peer-reviewed journal, prompting questions about the validity of the claims. The computer was able to complete basic addition through electrical probes inserted into the neuron. The manipulation of electrical currents through neurons was not a trivial accomplishment, however. Unlike conventional computer architecture, which is based on the binary on/off states, neurons are capable of existing in thousands of states and communicate with each other through synaptic connections with each containing over 200,000 channels. Each can be dynamically shifted in a process called self-organization to constantly form and reform new connections. A conventional computer program called the dynamic clamp, capable of reading the electrical pulses from the neurons in real time and interpreting them was written by Eve Marder, a neurobiologist at Brandeis University. This program was used to manipulate the electrical signals being input into the neurons to represent numbers and to communicate with each other to return the sum. While this computer is a very basic example of a wetware structure it represents a small example with fewer neurons than found in a more complex organ. It is thought by Ditto that by increasing the number of neurons present the chaotic signals sent between them will self-organize into a more structured pattern, such as the regulation of heart neurons into a constant heartbeat found in humans and other living organisms.

=== Biological models for conventional computing ===
After his work creating a basic computer from leech neurons, Ditto continued to work not only with organic molecules and wetware but also on the concept of applying the chaotic nature of biological systems and organic molecules to conventional material and logic gates. Chaotic systems have advantages for generating patterns and computing higher-order functions like memory, arithmetic logic, and input/output operations. In his article Construction of a Chaotic Computer Chip Ditto discusses the advantages in programming of using chaotic systems, with their greater sensitivity to respond and reconfigure logic gates in his conceptual chaotic chip. The main difference between a chaotic computer chip and a conventional computer chip is the reconfigurability of the chaotic system. Unlike a traditional computer chip, where a programmable gate array element must be reconfigured through the switching of many single-purpose logic gates, a chaotic chip can reconfigure all logic gates through the control of the pattern generated by the non-linear chaotic element.

=== Impact of wetware in cognitive biology ===
Cognitive biology evaluates cognition as a basic biological function. W. Tecumseh Fitch, a professor of cognitive biology at the University of Vienna, is a leading theorist on ideas of cellular intentionality. The idea is that not only do whole organisms have a sense of "aboutness" of intentionality, but that single cells also carry a sense of intentionality through cells' ability to adapt and reorganize in response to certain stimuli. Fitch discusses the idea of nano-intentionality, specifically in regards to neurons, in their ability to adjust rearrangements to create neural networks. He discusses the ability of cells such as neurons to respond independently to stimuli such as damage to be what he considers "intrinsic intentionality" in cells, explaining that "while at a vastly simpler level than intentionality at the human cognitive level, I propose that this basic capacity of living things [response to stimuli] provides the necessary building blocks for cognition and higher-order intentionality." Fitch describes the value of his research to specific areas of computer science such as artificial intelligence and computer architecture. He states "If a researcher aims to make a conscious machine, doing it with rigid switches (whether vacuum tubes or static silicon chips) is barking up the wrong tree." Fitch believes that an important aspect of the development of areas such as artificial intelligence is wetware with nano-intentionally, and autonomous ability to adapt and restructure itself.

In a review of the above-mentioned research conducted by Fitch, Daniel Dennett, a professor at Tufts University, discusses the importance of the distinction between the concept of hardware and software when evaluating the idea of wetware and organic material such as neurons. Dennett discusses the value of observing the human brain as a preexisting example of wetware. He sees the brain as having "the competence of a silicon computer to take on an unlimited variety of temporary cognitive roles." Dennett disagrees with Fitch on certain areas, such as the relationship of software/hardware versus wetware, and what a machine with wetware might be capable of. Dennett highlights the importance of additional research into human cognition to better understand the intrinsic mechanisms by which the human brain can operate, to better create an organic computer.

=== Ethical and philosophical implications ===
Wetware computers may have substantial ethical implications, for instance related to possible potentials to sentience and suffering and dual-use technology.

Moreover, in some cases the human brain itself may be connected as a kind of "wetware" to other information technology systems which may also have large social and ethical implications, including issues related to intimate access to people's brains. For example, in 2021 Chile became the first country to approve neurolaw that establishes rights to personal identity, free will and mental privacy.

The concept of artificial insects may raise substantial ethical questions, including questions related to the decline in insect populations.

It is an open question whether human cerebral organoids could develop a degree or form of consciousness. Whether or how it could acquire its moral status with related rights and limits may also be potential future questions. There is research on how consciousness could be detected. As cerebral organoids may acquire human brain-like neural function subjective experience and consciousness may be feasible. Moreover, it may be possible that they acquire such upon transplantation into animals. A study notes that it may, in various cases, be morally permissible "to create self-conscious animals by engrafting human cerebral organoids, but in the case, the moral status of such animals should be carefully considered".

== Applications ==
Wetware has driven innovations in brain-computer interfaces (BCIs), allowing neural activity to control external devices and enabling people with disabilities to regain communication and movement. Neuromorphic engineering, which mimics neural architectures using silicon, has resulted in low-power, highly adaptive artificial systems.

Synthetic biology has enabled the development of programmable biological processors for diagnostics and smart therapeutics. Brain organoids are also being used for computational pattern recognition and memory emulation. Large-scale international efforts like the Human Brain Project aim to simulate the entire human brain using insights from wetware.

== Evaluating potential and limitations ==
The core advantage of wetware is its potential to overcome the rigidity and energy inefficiencies of binary transistor-based systems. Digital systems operate through fixed binary pathways and consume increasing energy as computational loads increase. Wetware, in contrast, uses decentralized and adaptive data flow that mimics biology. Notwithstanding the encouraging advances, several challenges hinder the effective utilization of wetware computing systems. Scalability is problematic due to the inherent variability of biological systems and their responsiveness to environmental factors, which makes large-scale implementation difficult. Additionally, the absence of standardization when combining silicon and biological systems hampers reproducibility and cooperation between research groups biological systems must also be stabilized carefully to turn away genetic drift and contamination necessary for reliable computational functionality.

Good parts – Replacing binary systems with organic cell structures opens the door to decentralized adaptive systems. Cells naturally form clusters and connections, much like neurons transmitting electrical and biochemical signals. Such a shift would increase scalability and efficiency, enabling users to interact with information in an intuitive and organic manner. Still, biological systems are sensitive to environmental changes, which presents challenges for standardization and reproducibility. Additionally, ethical concerns remain especially in using living neural tissue and lab-grown brain constructs.

Bad parts – Despite its promise, organic computing currently suffers from major limitations. Transistors still dominate computer architecture with a binary "on/off" model that restricts long-term energy efficiency and adaptability. As a result, personal computers in everyday use whether for work, games, or research often contribute to higher energy output and environmental impact.

=== Future applications ===
While there have been few major developments in the creation of an organic computer since the neuron-based calculator developed by Ditto in the 1990s, research continues to push the field forward, and in 2023 a functioning computer was constructed by researchers at the University of Illinois Urbana-Champaign using 80,000 mouse neurons as processor that can detect light and electrical signals. Projects such as the modeling of chaotic pathways in silicon chips by Ditto have made discoveries in ways of organizing traditional silicon chips and structuring computer architecture to be more efficient and better structured. Ideas emerging from the field of cognitive biology also help to continue to push discoveries in ways of structuring systems for artificial intelligence, to better imitate preexisting systems in humans.

In a proposed fungal computer using basidiomycetes, information is represented by spikes of electrical activity, a computation is implemented in a mycelium network, and an interface is realized via fruit bodies.

Connecting cerebral organoids (including computer-like wetware) with other nerve tissues may become feasible in the future, as is the connection of physical artificial neurons (not necessarily organic) and the control of muscle tissue. External modules of biological tissue could trigger parallel trains of stimulation back into the brain. All-organic devices could be advantageous because it could be biocompatible which may allow it to be implanted into the human body. This may enable treatments of certain diseases and injuries to the nervous system.

=== Prototypes ===
- In late 2021, scientists, including two from Cortical Labs, demonstrated that grown brain cells integrated into digital systems can carry out goal-directed tasks with performance-scores. In particular, the human brain cells learned to play a simulated (via electrophysiological stimulation) Pong which they learned faster than known machine intelligence systems, albeit to a lower skill-level than both AI and humans each. Moreover, the study suggests it provides "first empirical evidence" of differences in an information-processing capacity between neurons from different species as the human brain cells performed better than mouse cells.
- Also in December 2021, researchers from Max Planck Institute for Polymer Research (MPI-PR) reported the development of organic low-power neuromorphic electronics which they built into a robot, enabling it to learn sensorimotorically within the real world, rather than via simulations. For the chip, polymers were used and coated with an ion-rich gel to enable the material to carry an electric charge like real neurons.
- In 2022, researchers from MPI-PR demonstrated an artificial spiking neuron based on polymers that operates in the biological wetware, enabling synergetic operation between the artificial and biological components.
- In 2025, Cortical Labs started offering an online service renting out access to their CL1 wetware computers, which could be accessed through a Python interface. In February 2026, independent developer Sean Cole used this Python access to teach a colony of human brain cells to play Doom in about a week's time. The brain cells were derived from the CEO's own white blood cells, which were turned into induced pluripotent stem cells then induced into neurons.

=== Companies active in wetware computing ===
Three companies are focusing on wetware computing using living neurons:

- FinalSpark, Switzerland, founded in 2014
- Koniku, USA, founded in 2015
- Cortical Labs, Australia, founded in 2020

== Convergence of AI and wetware ==
One technology developing today is the fusion of artificial intelligence (AI) with wetware, coined organoid intelligence. Modern research shows that hybrid systems combining living neural networks with AI can enable self-repair, real-time adaptation, and emotional intelligence. These systems are more flexible than conventional AI and can integrate learning and memory in real time. Such integration lays the foundation for AI that mirrors human cognition and behavior, potentially creating intelligent systems grounded in neuroscience.

Neural networks embodied in AI systems could facilitate continuous learning, emotional processing, and fault tolerance more than existing silicon-based implementations. Additionally, AI systems based on neuroethical principles could uphold transparency, fairness, and autonomy. While early research is ongoing, the integration of wetware and artificial intelligence seeks to redefine both fields with the possibility of creating more human-like, moral, and resilient intelligent systems.

== See also ==
- Artificial neural network
- Brain in a vat
- Chemical computer
- Quantum computer
- Unconventional computing
- Wetware (brain)
- Biosensor
- Biological computing
- Machine olfaction
- Neural processing unit (NPU)
- Organoid intelligence
