= Hybrot =

Cybernetic organism ("hybrid robot")

A hybrot (short for "hybrid robot") is a cybernetic organism in the form of a robot controlled by a computer consisting of both electronic and biological elements. The biological elements are typically rat neurons connected to a computer chip. More broadly, they are robots created with a hybrid of mechatronics fused with biological or organic structures to create non-traditional robots. Unlike conventional robots, which rely solely on digital computation, hybrots are controlled by networks of living neurons cultured in vitro, forming a closed-loop system between the biological controller and the robotic body.

Hybrots are primarily used as experimental platforms in fields such as neuroscience, biohybrid systems, and artificial intelligence research. These systems allow scientists to explore how biological neural networks learn, adapt, and interact with external environments through robotic embodiment. Their adaptability and responsiveness to external stimuli are difficult to replicate with purely artificial materials.

However, the integration of living brain tissue into machines also raises significant ethical and philosophical questions about life, autonomy, and the boundaries between organic and artificial systems.

== Evolution of the definition ==
The definition of hybrots has evolved significantly since the term was first coined due to advances in bioengineering, robotics, neuroscience, and ethics.

The term was first coined by Dr. Steve M. Potter at Georgia Tech. The original purpose was to describe how real neurons behave in hybrid robotic systems controlled by living neurons. The focus of the original study was integration of biological neurons cultured from rodent brains into robotic systems.

By the mid 2010s, the scope of this definition was further broadened due to the exploration of integrating biological neural networks with robotic systems to study embodied cognition. This approach emphasized the role of the body and environment in shaping cognitive processes.

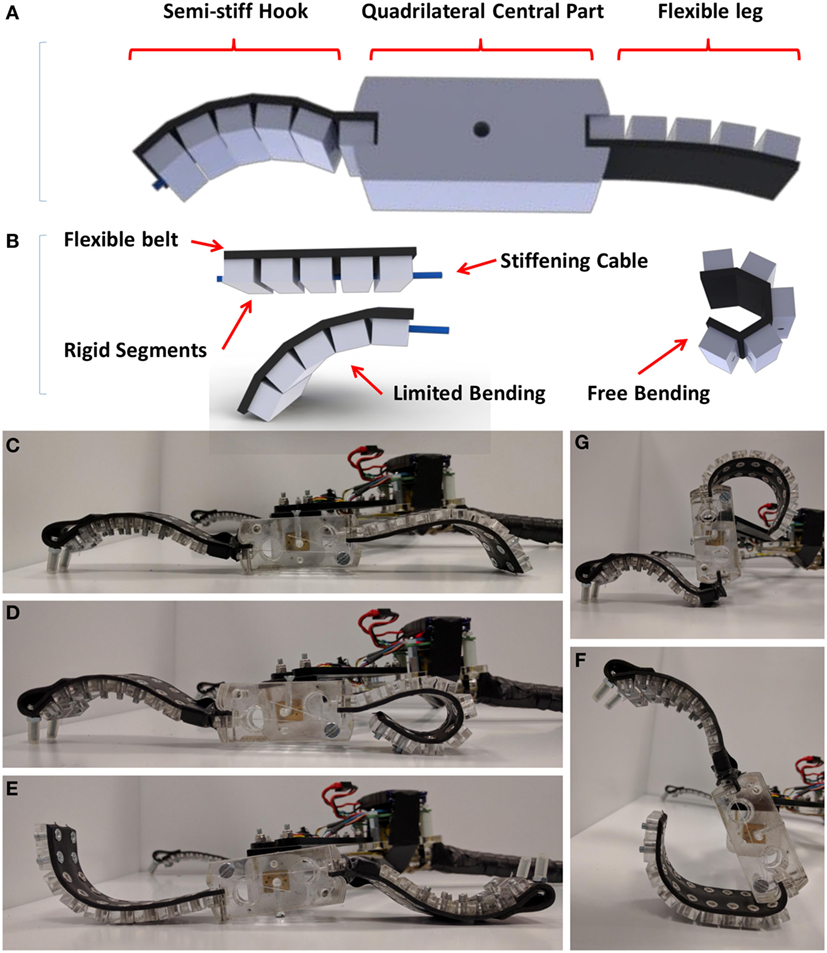
Soft-Legged Wheel-Based Robot with Terrestrial Locomotion Abilities

By the late 2010s, due to increased interest in brain-machine interfaces (BMIs) and soft-robotics, the term "hybrot" was used in studies focusing on the seamless integration of biological tissues, cardiac cells, or plant systems with electronic components.

With the growing complexity of autonomous systems, "hybrots" are currently discussed in ethical, legal, and philosophical contexts. Some of the key themes of discussions in this context include whether "Hybrots" can be considered as living systems, should they have rights or moral considerations or liability associated with the implications of their decisions.

As a result, the definition of Hybrot has become interdisciplinary, incorporating not just biology and engineering, but law, philosophy, and sociology.

== Features ==
What separates a hybrot from a cyborg is that the latter term is commonly used to refer to a cybernetically enhanced human or animal; while a hybrot is an entirely new type of creature constructed from organic and artificial materials. It is perhaps helpful to think of the hybrot as "semi-living", a term also used by the hybrot's inventors.

Another interesting feature of the hybrot is its longevity. Neurons separated from a living brain usually die after only a couple of months. However, a specially designed incubator built around a gas-tight culture chamber selectively permeable to carbon dioxide, but impermeable to water vapor, reduces the risk of contamination and evaporation, and may extend the life of the hybrot to one to two years.

== Potential future uses of hybrots ==
The concept of hybrots has opened up numerous possible applications across neuroscience, robotics, medicine, and ethics. While many of these are still experimental or theoretical, ongoing research continues to expand the scope of what such systems might achieve.

=== Neuroscience research ===
Hybrots serve as novel models for studying neural network behavior and brain function. By interfacing cultured neurons with robotic systems, scientists can investigate how neural circuits process information and adapt to stimuli. This approach supports research into learning mechanisms, plasticity, and disease modeling.

=== Advanced brain-machine interfaces (BMIs) ===
Hybrots may improve brain-machine interfaces by offering more nuanced and biologically realistic control systems. These advances could benefit prosthetic development, neurorehabilitation, and even cognitive augmentation.

=== Biohybrid AI systems ===
Future AI systems may incorporate living neural networks to enhance adaptability and real-time learning. Hybrots could enable biologically inspired decision-making architectures, especially in dynamic or uncertain environments.

=== Synthetic biology and biocomputation ===
Hybrots offer opportunities for biohybrid computing systems, where the energy-efficient, parallel processing abilities of neurons are used to support computation. Such systems blur the line between living organisms and machines.

=== Ethical and philosophical prototyping ===
As Hybrots become more autonomous and life-like, they raise pressing ethical questions: What constitutes consciousness? Should hybrid systems have rights? These questions are increasingly relevant in law and philosophy.

=== Environmental monitoring and agriculture ===
Equipped with biological sensors, hybrots could serve as adaptive tools for monitoring pollutants or assessing soil health. Applications in precision agriculture could lead to better resource efficiency.

=== Medical and healthcare innovations ===
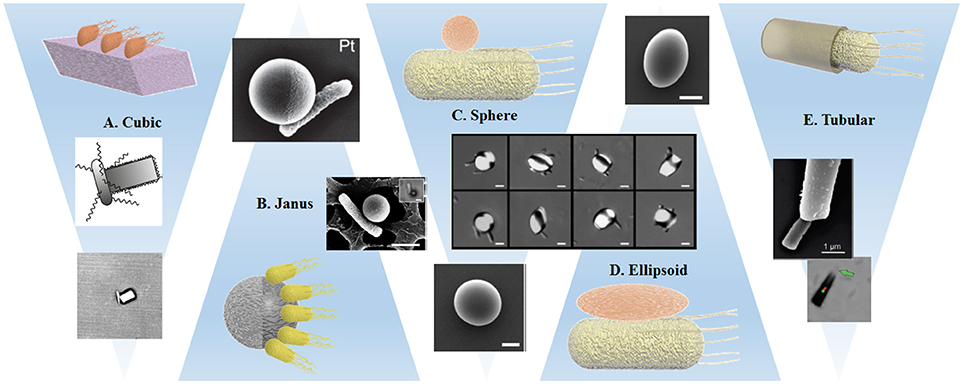
Interaction of bacteria with variously shaped cargoes

Biohybrid robots may one day assist in targeted therapy, such as drug delivery or microsurgery. Their capacity for navigating complex biological environments offers promise for next-generation medical devices.

=== Military and surveillance applications ===
Though ethically contentious, hybrots might find use in military or surveillance settings, offering adaptability and decision-making capabilities in complex environments.

=== Educational and public engagement tools ===
Hybrots provide tools for STEM education and public science outreach, demonstrating principles of neuroscience, robotics, and bioethics in an accessible, interactive format.

== History ==
This feat was first accomplished in 2003 by Dr. Steve M. Potter, a professor of biomedical engineering at the Georgia Institute of Technology:

In his experiment, Potter places a droplet of solution containing thousands of rat neuron cells onto a silicon chip that's embedded with 60 electrodes connected to an amplifier. The electrical signals that the cells fire at one another are picked up by the electrodes which then send the amplified signal into a computer. The computer, in turn, wirelessly relays the data to the robot.

The robot then manifests this neuronal activity with physical motion, each of its movements a direct result of neurons talking to neurons. And the robot also sends information back to the cells. Equipped with light sensors, the robot receives input about its location in the playpen from infrared signals lining the borders.

=== 2000s ===
- Coining of the term "hybrot" by Dr. Steve M. Potter at Georgia Tech (c. 2003).
- First successful integration of cultured rat cortical neurons with robotic platforms.
- Use of multi-electrode arrays (MEAs) to record and stimulate living neurons.
- Many hybrots were built using thin film materials like MEMS and PDMS, layered with muscle cells. These two-dimensional designs were used to create swimming motions, such as in soft robotic stingrays.
- Purpose: study neural computation, plasticity, and behavior in closed-loop environments.
- Example systems: MEA-controlled wheeled robots that navigate based on neural activity.

=== 2010s ===
- Biohybrid robots were developed using live skeletal muscle, cardiomyocytes, and even plant or fungal tissues to enable actuation and sensing.
- Advances in 3D printing and tissue engineering enabled the creation of customizable 3D biological structures, moving beyond traditional 2D layers and supporting their integration into smart soft robotic systems.
- A biohybrid swimmer featuring functional neuromuscular junctions and time-irreversible flagellar dynamics was developed in 2019. It represented the first swimmer powered by skeletal muscle tissue, actuated by external light stimuli, and operated at low Reynolds numbers with relatively slow swimming speeds (0.92 μm/s).

=== 2020s ===
- Integrating both neuronal and skeletal muscle tissue into a single biobot attracted significant interest, as it mimicked native muscle structure and enhanced the controllability of biorobotic systems.

== See also ==
- Animat
- Artificial intelligence
- Biorobotics
- Biohybrid robot
- Biohybrid system
- Brain–computer interface
- Neurorobotics
- Organoid intelligence
- Organ-on-a-chip
- Semi-biotic systems
- Xenobot
