= Biohybrid system =

Union of biological and artificial materials

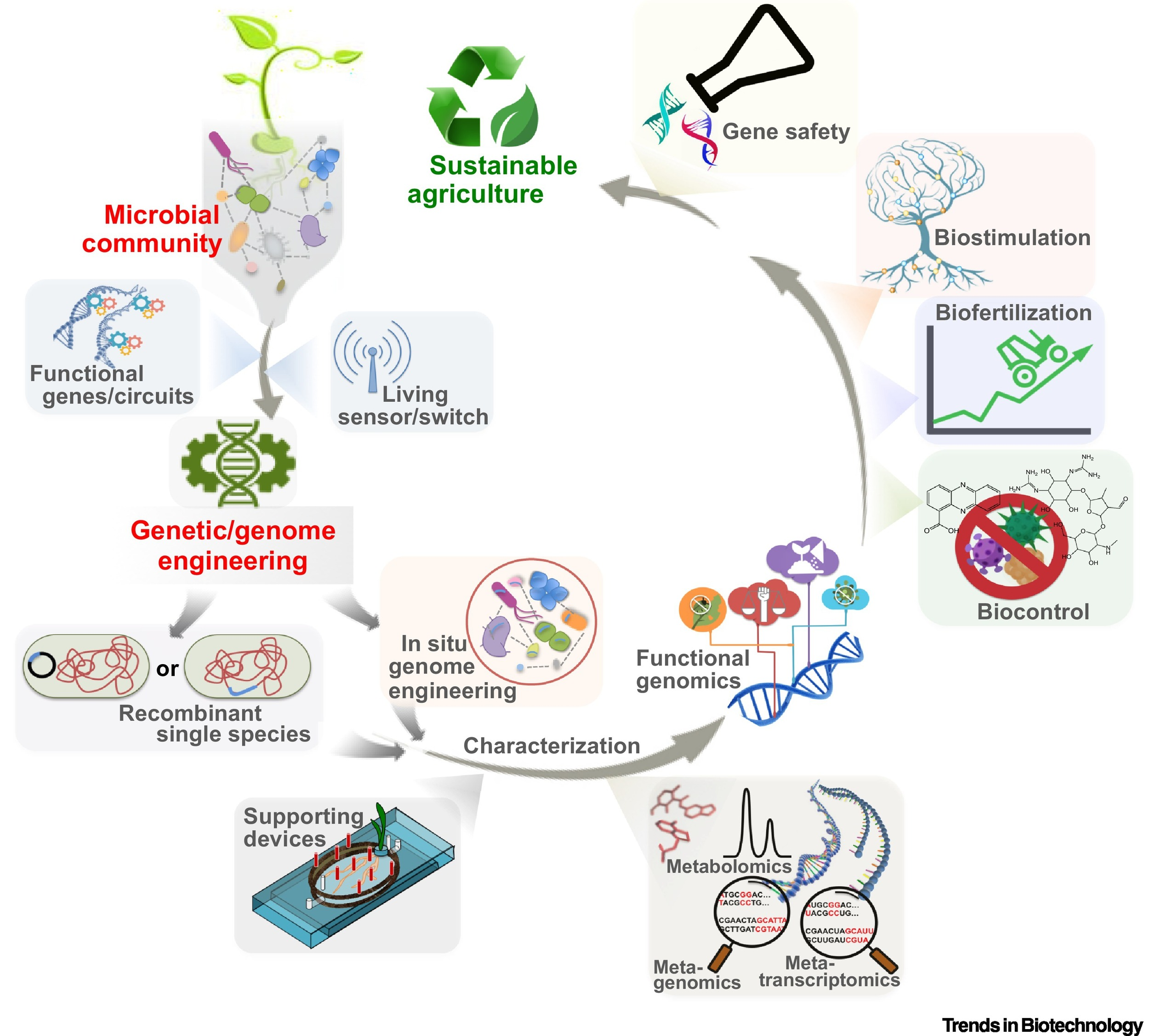
Synthetic biology enabled microbiome engineering in sustainable agriculture

Biohybrid systems refer to the integration of biological materials, such as cells or tissues, with artificial components, including electronics or mechanical structure. This combination incorporates the capabilities of living organisms with the precision of man-made technology. As a result, these systems perform tasks that neither biology nor machines could achieve independently.

Biohybrid systems might use lab-cultured muscle cells to power small robots or combine sensors with living tissue for better health sensing. The intent behind these systems is to combine the benefits of biological and technological components to introduce new solutions for complex medical challenges.

Biohybrid systems may have transformative potential across sectors, such as robotics to create actuators and sensors that mimic natural muscle and nerve function, medicine in developing smart implants and drug delivery systems, in prosthetics for enhancing user control through neural or muscular interfaces and environmental sustainability for deploying biohybrid solutions for pollution sensing or remediation.

== Origin ==
The term "biohybrid" is a compound of "bio" from biology (meaning life) and "hybrid" (referring to a combination of distinct elements), denoting a field of study. Its use helps distinguish such systems from purely biological constructs or entirely synthetic machines. Early academic mentions may include bio actuated robotics papers and foundational tissue-robot integration studies published in journals like Nature Biotechnology or Science Robotics. The emergence of the term reflects a growing recognition of the need to describe systems that do not fit cleanly into traditional categories.

== Design principles ==
One of the most significant biohybrid challenges is to engineer interfaces between living tissue and artificial materials that are efficient. This means having precise control over adhesion at the surface, diffusion of nutrients, and signal conduction. Actuation mechanisms within the heart of these systems generate movement or mechanical response. These may be in the form of living muscle cells such as skeletal myocytes or cardiomyocytes, soft pneumatic actuators, or electrical stimulation-responsive tissues.

Materials selection is equally critical. Hydrogels, elastomers like PDMS (polydimethylsiloxane), and biopolymers are commonly used due to their softness and biocompatibility. These materials must support cell viability, resist immune attack, and allow the integration of mechanical or electrical components.

== Key components ==
At their core, biohybrid systems work by bridging living biological parts with technology. Through this integration, functionality that neither system could accomplish singularly is possible.

Biological parts may be cells, tissues, or even organs—occasionally cultured in a laboratory setting. These biological parts carry out biologically inspired behaviors, such as muscle contraction or chemical sensing in the body.

Technological components may constitute devices like sensors, electronic components, and mechanical structure. These manipulate the system, supply power, or transfer data. An example is a sensor that is implantable within a body and detects glucose levels as it sends information to a smart phone.

By integrating these artificial and biological parts, biohybrid systems can perform advanced functions, such as tissue regeneration, real-time health monitoring, or the recovery of motor function in paralysis patients.

Biohybrid systems generally consist of two major components: the biological and the mechanical.

- Biological components may include muscle cells for contraction, endothelial cells for vascularization, and stem cells for regenerative capabilities.
- Mechanical components comprise soft actuators that mimic organic motion, synthetic scaffolds that provide support and structure, and microfluidic systems that facilitate the delivery of nutrients and removal of waste.

These components are combined in a manner that allows for dynamic, lifelike behavior—such as the contraction of tissue or the propagation of mechanical waves—while maintaining biocompatibility and durability.

== Applications ==
The range of applications for biohybrid systems is broad and continuously expanding. In robotics, biohybrid structures have been used to engineer microscopic, muscle-driven machines, such as Harvard University's biohybrid stingray robot. In medical applications, they offer new alternatives for organ repair and augmentation, including biohybrid heart valves and esophageal scaffolds.

Biohybrids are also promising in neural interfaces, where the goal is to create long-lasting, stable interaction between mechanical devices and brain tissue. Muscle-actuated drug response platforms are under exploration in pharmacology for modelling and real-time screening.

== Examples ==
Several high-profile research projects have demonstrated the potential of biohybrid systems:

- Harvard researchers developed a biohybrid swimming ray powered by rat cardiac cells layered onto a gold skeleton, mimicking the motion of a real stingray.
- At the Massachusetts Institute of Technology, a cardiac pump actuated entirely by living heart muscle cells was engineered to simulate the behavior of a beating heart.
- Bio actuated soft robots have been built to simulate gut peristalsis, using muscle contractions to replicate natural wave-like movement in the digestive tract.

== Challenges and limitations ==
As with many technologies that involve living systems, biohybrid systems raise important ethical and biomedical questions. Cell sourcing remains a key issue, particularly when embryonic or animal-derived cells are used. Long-term viability is another concern—living tissues must be kept alive with nutrients and oxygen, and they often degrade or elicit immune responses when implanted.

Powering these biological parts presents logistical and ethical hurdles as well. Systems must either include internal mechanisms for nutrient delivery or be supported externally, which can limit portability and independence.

== Future directions ==
Researchers are exploring self-directed, self-regulated organ substitutes and regenerative implants that can respond to their surroundings in real-time. These systems may be integrated with artificial intelligence to make them adjust to stimuli and coordinate complex behaviors.

Future potential applications are wearable biohybrid systems for rehabilitation, space medicine devices for long-duration missions, and implantable devices that integrate into human physiology.

== See also ==
- AI effect
- Tissue engineering focuses primarily on the growth of biological tissues, often in static environments.
- Soft robotics employs flexible materials for motion, but typically lacks living components.
- Biomimicry includes biologically inspired robots but usually does not integrate real biological tissues.
- Organs-on-chips simulate organ functions using microfluidics, without actuation or muscular function.
- Organoid intelligence is used to create intelligent computer systems using biological means such as the use of organs.
