= AI effect =

Phenomenon in which AI achievements are reclassified as non-intelligent

The AI effect is a phenomenon in which advances in artificial intelligence (AI) lead to a redefinition of what is considered intelligence, such that capabilities achieved by AI systems are no longer regarded as examples of "real" intelligence.

The concept has been used to describe both a cognitive tendency and a sociotechnical pattern, in which successful AI techniques are reclassified as routine computation or absorbed into other domains.

Historian Pamela McCorduck described this as a recurring feature of AI research, noting in her 2004 book Machines Who Think that once a problem is solved, it is no longer considered evidence of intelligence. Researcher Rodney Brooks similarly observed in 2002 that once systems are understood, they are often regarded as "just computation".

== Definition ==
The AI effect refers to a shift in how intelligence is defined as machines acquire new capabilities. Tasks such as playing chess, recognizing speech, or interpreting images were historically considered indicators of intelligence, but after successful automation they are often reclassified as routine computation.

McCorduck described this as an "odd paradox", in which successful AI systems are assimilated into other domains, leaving AI researchers to focus on unsolved problems. The phenomenon is often interpreted as an instance of moving the goalposts.

A commonly cited formulation is Tesler's theorem, often expressed as "AI is whatever hasn't been done yet".

When problems are not fully formalised, they may be described using models involving human computation, such as human-assisted Turing machines.

== Historical examples ==
=== Game playing ===
Early AI systems capable of playing games such as checkers and chess were initially regarded as demonstrations of machine intelligence. As these systems improved and became better understood, their achievements were often reinterpreted as examples of computation rather than intelligence.

The victory of IBM's Deep Blue over Garry Kasparov in 1997 is a frequently cited example. Critics argued that the system relied on brute-force methods rather than genuine understanding.

=== Pattern recognition ===
Technologies such as optical character recognition and speech recognition were once considered core problems in artificial intelligence. As these systems became reliable and widely deployed, they were increasingly treated as standard engineering solutions.

=== Integration into applications ===
Many techniques originally developed within AI research have been incorporated into broader technological systems, including marketing, automation, and software applications.

Nick Bostrom noted in 2006 that widely adopted technologies are often no longer labeled as AI.

Michael Swaine reported in 2007 that AI advances are often presented as developments in other fields.

Marvin Minsky observed that successful AI innovations often evolve into separate disciplines.

== Contemporary discussion ==
The AI effect continues to be discussed in the context of recent advances in machine learning, particularly large language models and other generative AI systems. As these systems have become more widely used, some researchers and commentators have noted that their capabilities are frequently described as statistical or mechanical once understood, rather than as intelligence. For instance, different combinations of human and AI action in workflows can be considered "augmented intelligence" and specific weights within various combinations of augmentation should be used to define ethical and practical considerations contextually for those workflows.

A 2016 survey of artificial intelligence also noted that AI systems are increasingly embedded in everyday applications, reinforcing earlier observations that successful AI technologies tend to become normalized and no longer identified as AI.

At the same time, the widespread commercial use of artificial intelligence has led to greater visibility of the field, contrasting with earlier periods in which AI techniques were often present but unacknowledged.

== Interpretations ==
=== Cognitive bias ===
Some authors describe the AI effect as a cognitive bias in which expectations of intelligence shift as machines achieve new capabilities.

=== Sociotechnical perspective ===
Another interpretation emphasizes how technologies are reclassified over time as they become widespread and commercially successful.

=== Philosophical debate ===
Some philosophers argue that reclassification reflects genuine conceptual distinctions rather than bias.

== Historical context ==
During periods such as the AI winter, researchers sometimes avoided the term "artificial intelligence" due to negative perceptions.

In the 21st century, however, the term "AI" has become widely used in public discourse and marketing.

== Broader implications ==
The AI effect has been linked to broader questions about human uniqueness and the nature of intelligence. Michael Kearns suggested that people may seek to preserve a special role for humans.

Similar patterns have been observed in studies of animal cognition.

Herbert A. Simon noted that artificial intelligence can provoke strong emotional reactions.

== See also ==
- ELIZA effect
- Moravec's paradox
- Chinese room
- Functionalism (philosophy of mind)
- Computational intelligence
- Artificial intelligence in video games
- God of the gaps
- Organoid intelligence
