= The World in 2050 =

“The World in 2050” was a global futurist writing contest co-sponsored by The Economist magazine and Royal Dutch Shell in 2000. It carried a first prize of $20,000, which included publication of the winning piece in The Economist’s annual flagship publication, “The World In”. Entries were accepted from around the world via a website set up for the purpose, worldin2050.com, and at various Royal Dutch Shell offices worldwide. The judging panel was chaired by Richard O’Brien, co-founder of Outsights, a scenario planning consultancy, and included:

- Bill Emmott, author and then-editor of The Economist;
- Esther Dyson, an angel investor and philanthropist ;
- Sir Mark Moody-Stuart, then-chairman of Royal Dutch Shell ;
- Matt Ridley, a British scientist and member of the House of Lords;
- Peter Warshall, an ecologist, activist and former editor of the Whole Earth Catalog and Whole Earth magazine.

Over 3,000 entries were submitted from 75 countries, and the $20,000 first prize was awarded to Bill Douglass, an American student. Two second prizes of $10,000 each and five $5,000 third prizes were also awarded.
