= Guided rat =

Rat with electrodes implanted in the brain

A remotely guided rat, popularly called a ratbot or robo-rat, is a rat with electrodes implanted in the medial forebrain bundle (MFB) and sensorimotor cortex of its brain. They were developed in 2002 by Sanjiv Talwar and John Chapin at the State University of New York Downstate Medical Center. The rats wear a small electronics backpack containing a radio receiver and electrical stimulator. The rat receives remote stimulation in the sensorimotor cortex via its backpack that causes the rat to feel a sensation in its left or right whiskers, and stimulation in the MFB that is interpreted as a reward or pleasure.

After a period of training and conditioning using MFB stimulation as a reward, the rats can be remotely directed to move left, right, and forward in response to whisker stimulation signals. It is possible to roughly guide the animal along an obstacle course, jumping small gaps and scaling obstacles.

== Ethics ==
Concerns have been raised by animal rights groups about the use of animals in this context, particularly due to a concern about the removal of autonomy from an independent creature. For example, a spokesman of the Dr Hadwen Trust, a group funding alternatives to animal research in medicine, has said that the experiments are an "appalling example of how the human species instrumentalizes other species."

Researchers tend to liken the training mechanism of the robo-rat to standard operant conditioning techniques. Talwar himself has acknowledged the ethical issues apparent in the development of the robo-rat, but points out that the research meets standards for animal treatment laid down by the National Institute of Health. Moreover, the researchers emphasize that the animals are trained, not coerced, into particular behaviors. Because the rats are encouraged to act via the reward of pleasure, not muscularly compelled to behave in a particular manner, their behavior under MFB stimulation is likened to a carrot-and-stick model of encouraged behavior versus a system of mind control. It seems unlikely that the rats could be persuaded to knowingly risk their lives even with this stimulation. "Our animals were completely happy and treated well," Talwar stated.

The technology is reminiscent of experiments performed in 1965 by Dr. Jose Delgado, a controversial scientist who was able to pacify a charging bull via electrodes fitted in its brain. He was also said to control cats and monkeys like "electronic toys." Doctor Robert Galbraith Heath also placed electrodes deep into the brains of patients and wrote hundreds of medical papers on his work.

== See also ==
- Remote control animal
