= Adaptive Behavior (journal) =

- Discipline: Artificial intelligence
- Language: English
- Edited by: Tom Froese

Publication details
- History: 1992–present
- Publisher: SAGE Publications
- Frequency: Bimonthly
- Impact factor: 1.942 (2020)

Standard abbreviations
- ISO 4: Adapt. Behav.

Indexing
- ISSN: 1059-7123 (print); 1741-2633 (web)
- LCCN: 93642640
- OCLC no.: 50320693

Links
- Journal homepage; Online access; Online archive

Adaptive Behavior is a bimonthly peer-reviewed scientific journal that covers the field of adaptive behavior in living organisms and autonomous artificial systems. It was established in 1992 and is the official journal of the International Society of Adaptive Behavior. It is published by SAGE Publications.

The editor-in-chief is Tom Froese (Okinawa Institute of Science and Technology).

== Abstracting and indexing ==
The journal is abstracted and indexed in Scopus, the Science Citation Index Expanded, and the Social Sciences Citation Index. According to the Journal Citation Reports, the journal has a 2020 impact factor of 1.942.
