= Roseman University of Health Sciences =

Private university in Henderson, Nevada, US

Coordinates: 36.073821°N 115.064905°W

Roseman University of Health Sciences is a private university focused on healthcare with its main campus in Henderson, Nevada, United States. It has additional campuses in South Jordan, Utah, and Summerlin, Nevada. It enrolled its first class in January 2001 and was originally called the Nevada College of Pharmacy and the University of Southern Nevada.

Roseman University of Health Sciences is accredited by the Northwest Commission on Colleges and Universities (NWCCU). It is also licensed to operate in the State of Nevada by the Nevada Commission on Postsecondary Education.

== Academics ==
The university offers the Doctor of Dental Medicine, the Doctor of Pharmacy, and the Bachelor of Science in Nursing degrees. Roseman's programs are utilize a block system in which students focus on one topic at a time (rather than enrolling in multiple courses concurrently).

The Roseman University of Health Sciences College of Pharmacy is accredited by the Accreditation Council for Pharmacy Education (ACPE). The college has an institutional membership in the American Association of Colleges of Pharmacy (AACP).

The Roseman University of Health Sciences College of Nursing is approved by the Nevada State Board of Nursing. The College of Nursing in South Jordan is approved by the Utah Division of Occupational and Professional Licensing. The college is also accredited by the National League for Nursing Accrediting Commission, Inc. (NLNAC).

The Roseman University College of Dental Medicine Doctor of Dental Medicine (DMD) and Advanced Education in Orthodontics and Dentofacial Orthopedics (AEODO) programs are accredited by the Commission on Dental Accreditation (CODA).

== Colleges and programs ==
- College of Dental Medicine
- College of Medicine (opened in July 2025)
- College of Pharmacy
- College of Nursing

== Name ==
The name of the institution is a portmanteau of the names of founding university president Harry Rosenberg and founding Pharmacy School dean Renee Coffman.

== See also ==
- American Student Dental Association
