= Integrated nanoliter system =

The integrated nanoliter system is a measuring, separating, and mixing device that is able to measure fluids to the nanoliter, mix different fluids for a specific product, and separate a solution into simpler solutions.

All features of the integrated nanoliter system are specifically designed for controlling very small volumes of liquid (referred as microfluidic solutions). The integrated nanoliter system's scalability depends on what type of processing method the system is based on (refer as technology platform) with each processing method having its advantages and disadvantages. Possible uses for the integrated nanoliter system are in controlling biological fluids (refer as synthetic biology) and accurately detecting changes in cells for genetic purposes (such as single-cell gene expression analysis) where the smaller scale directly influences the result and accuracy.

== Features ==
The integrated nanoliter system consists of microfabricated fluidic channels, heaters, temperature sensors, and fluorescence detectors. The microfabricated fluidic channels (basically very small pipes) act as the main transportation structures for any fluids as well as where reactions occur within the system. For the desired reactions to occur, the temperature needs to be adjusted. Therefore, heaters are attached to some microfabricated fluidic channels. To monitor and maintain the desired temperature, temperature sensors are crucial for successful and desired reactions. In order to accurately track the fluids before and after a reaction, fluorescence detectors are used for detecting the movements of the fluids within the system. For instance, when a specific fluid passes a certain point where it triggers or excites emission of light, the fluorescence detector is able to receive that emission and calculate the time it takes to reach that certain point.

== Technology platforms for scalability ==
There are three different technology platforms for the integrated nanoliter system's scalability. Therefore, the main processing method of the integrated nanoliter system varies from the type of technology platform it is using. The three technology platforms for scalability are electrokinetic manipulation, vesicle encapsulation, and mechanical valving.

=== Electrokinetic manipulation ===
The main processing method for controlling the fluid under this technology platform is the capillary electrophoresis, which is an electrokinetic phenomena. Capillary electrophoresis is a great method for controlling fluids because the charged particles of the fluid are being directed by the controllable electric field within the system. However, a disadvantage of the technique is that the method of controlling the fluid's particles heavily depends on the particles' original charges. Another disadvantage is that the possible fluid "leaks" within the system. These "leaks" occur through diffusion which are dependent on the size of the fluid's particles.

=== Vesicle encapsulation ===
The main processing method for controlling the fluid under this technology platform is to confine the fluids of interest in carrier molecules, which are generally droplets of water, vesicles, or micelles. The carrier molecules (with the fluid within them) are controlled by individually directing each carrier molecules within the microfabricated fluidic channels. This method is great for solving the possible fluid "leaks", since confinement of the fluid in a carrier molecule does not depend on the size of the fluid's particles. However, this technique has a disadvantage on how complex the solution can be when using the system.

=== Mechanical valving ===
The main processing method for controlling the fluid under this technology platform is the use of small mechanical valves. Mechanical valving is similar to a complex plumbing system because the microfabricated fluidic channels act as the plumbing pipes while the various controllable valves direct the fluid. Mechanical valving is also considered to be the most robust solution to the disadvantages of the electrokinetic manipulation and vesicle encapsulation, since the mechanical valves operate completely independent from the fluid's physical and chemical properties. Because the physical properties that make up the microfabricated fluidic channels and mechanical valves are difficult to process due to the system's extremely small scale, this technique has a disadvantage of creating an integrated nanoliter system with mechanical valving to the nanoliter scale.

== Possible uses ==
=== Synthetic biology ===
A possible use of the integrated nanoliter system is in synthetic biology (controlling biological fluids). Since the integrated nanoliter system is generally made up of many controllable microfabricated fluidic networks, integrated nanoliter systems are an ideal environment for controlling biological fluids. A common process of synthetic biology that uses the integrated nanoliter system is processing complex reactions among biological fluids, which usually involves separating a biological solution into individual pure or simpler reagent solutions then mixing the individual solutions for the desired product. An advantage of using the integrated nanoliter system in synthetic biology includes the extremely small length of the microfluidic networks that result in fast diffusion rates. Another advantage is the fast mixing rates due to the combination of diffusion and advection (chaotic mixing). Compared to previous microfluidic systems, another advantage is the smaller necessary amount of reagent solutions for a single operation due to the integrated nanoliter system's microscopic scalability. Smaller necessary amounts of reagent solutions tend to lead to more operations that can be carried out with less delay from gathering or reproducing the necessary amounts of reagent solutions.

=== Single-cell gene expression analysis ===
Another possible use of the integrated nanoliter system is in single-cell gene expression analysis. One benefit of using the integrated nanoliter system is its capability to detect the changes of a gene expression more accurately than the previous technique of microarray. The nanoliter system's microscopic scalability (nanoliter to picoliter scale) allows it to analyze the gene expression at the single-cell level (around 1 picoliter), while the microarray analyzes changes of the gene expression by averaging a large group of cells. Another convenient and important benefit is the integrated nanoliter system's capability of having all the necessary biological fluids in the system before operation by storing each biological fluid in a specific microfabricated fluidic network. The integrated nanoliter system is convenient because the biological fluids are all controlled by a computer compared to how previous systems required a manual loading of every biological fluid. The integrated nanoliter system is also important for the gene expression analysis because the analysis would not be undesirably influenced by contamination due to the "closed" system while in operation.
