= Bill Phillips (economist) =

New Zealand economist (1914–1975)

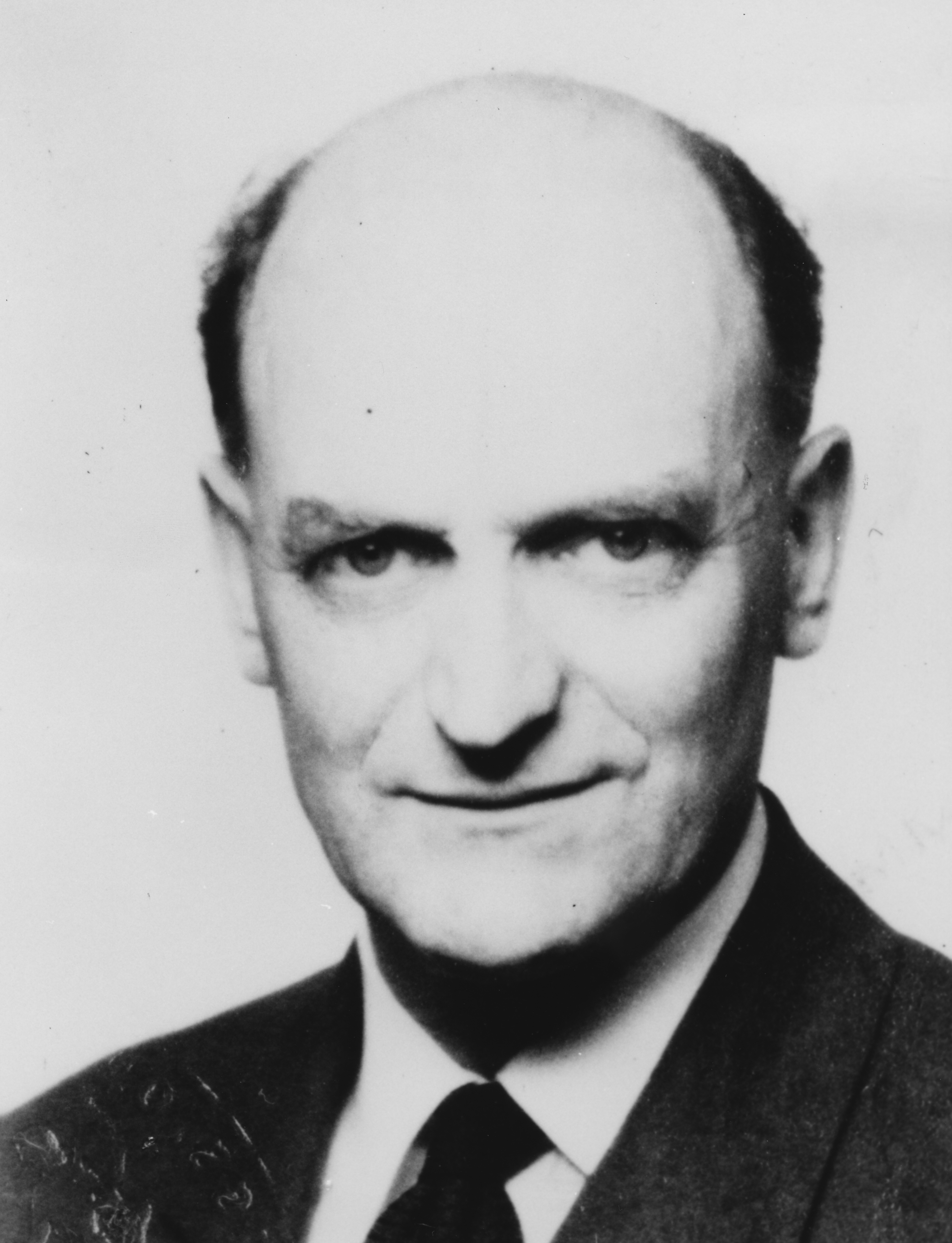
- Born: Alban William Housego Phillips; 18 November 1914; Te Rehunga near Dannevirke
- Died: 4 March 1975 (aged 60); Auckland

Academic background
- Education: London School of Economics
- Influences: Irving Fisher; John Maynard Keynes

Academic work
- Discipline: Macroeconomics
- School or tradition: Neo-Keynesian economics
- Institutions: London School of Economics; Australian National University; University of Auckland
- Notable ideas: Phillips curve

Alban William Housego "A. W." Phillips, MBE (18 November 1914 – 4 March 1975) was a New Zealand economist who spent most of his academic career as a professor of economics at the London School of Economics (LSE). He invented the Phillips curve relating level of employment and inflation in 1958. He also designed and built the MONIAC hydraulic computer macroeconomic model in 1949.

== Early life ==
Phillips was born at Te Rehunga near Dannevirke, New Zealand, to Harold Housego Phillips, a dairy farmer, and his wife, Edith Webber, a schoolteacher and postmistress. A mechanical aptitude began to emerge at an early age: at fifteen, Bill learned how to fix a motor vehicle engine, how to wire a shed for electrical lighting, build radios, and create a crude form of cinematography.

He left New Zealand before finishing school to work in Australia at a variety of jobs, including crocodile hunter and cinema manager. In 1937 Phillips headed to China, but had to escape to Russia when Japan invaded China. He travelled across Russia on the Trans-Siberian Railway and made his way to United Kingdom in 1938, where he studied electrical engineering.

== World War II ==
At the outbreak of World War II, Phillips joined the Royal Air Force and was sent to Singapore. When Singapore fell, he escaped on the troopship Empire State, which came under attack before safely arriving in Java. During the attack, Phillips improvised a machine gun mounting which allowed him to fire at the enemy.

When Java, too, was overrun, Phillips was captured by the Japanese, and spent three and a half years interned in a prisoner of war camp in the then Dutch East Indies (Indonesia). During this period he learned Chinese from other prisoners, repaired and miniaturised a secret radio, and fashioned a secret water boiler for tea which he hooked into the camp lighting system. Sir Edward 'Weary' Dunlop explained that Phillips’ radio maintained camp morale, and that if discovered, Phillips would have faced torture or even death. Laurens van der Post, who was in captivity with Phillips, described him as "one of the most singularly contained people I knew, quiet, true and without any trace of exhibitionism".

In 1946, he was made a Member of the Order of the British Empire (MBE) for his war service, in particular for his development of a system that allowed Brewster Buffalo fighter planes to fire through the propeller.

== Economics career ==
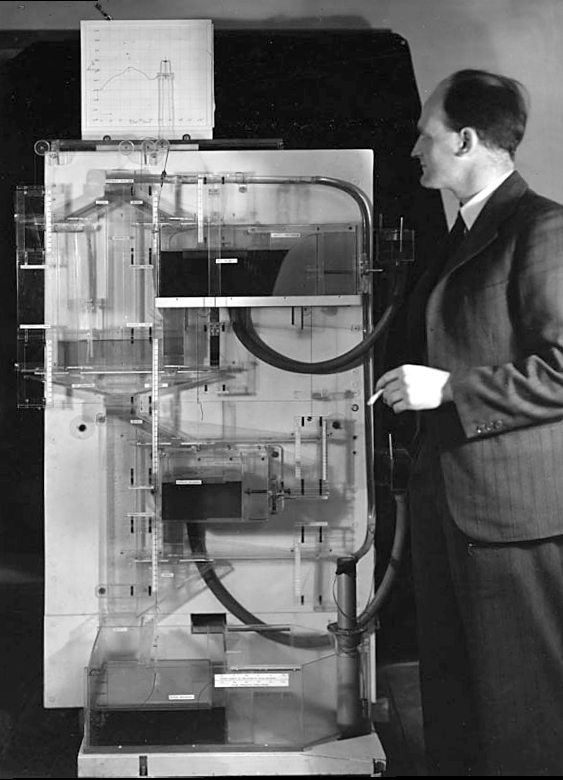
Phillips with his MONIAC computer

After the war Phillips moved to London and began studying sociology at the London School of Economics (LSE), because of his fascination with prisoners of war's ability to organize themselves. But he became bored with sociology and developed an interest in Keynesian theory, so he switched his course to economics and within eleven years was a professor of economics.

=== MONIAC ===
While a student at the LSE Phillips used his training as an engineer to develop MONIAC (‘Monetary National Income Analogue Computer’), an analogue computer which used hydraulics to model the workings of the British economy, inspiring the term hydraulic macroeconomics. It was very well received and Phillips was soon offered a teaching position at the LSE. He became an assistant lecturer in economics in 1950 and Tooke Professor in 1958.

=== Phillips curve ===
While at LSE, Phillips' work focused on British data and observed that in years when the unemployment rate was high, the rate of growth of nominal wages tended to be stable, or possibly fall. Conversely, when unemployment was low, wages rose rapidly. This sort of pattern had been noticed earlier by Irving Fisher, but, based on Phillip's intuition that “[w]hen the demand for labour is high and there are very few unemployed we should expect employers to bid wages rates up quite rapidly” and that firms would put up prices as a result, he published his own paper in 1958 on the relationship between inflation and unemployment, a relationship which became known as the Phillips curve. The Phillips curve can be written of terms of rate of growth of prices and unemployment. It was subject to the study of several Keynesian and neoclassical economists, especially in the context of the monetarist model by Milton Friedman and the new neoclassical macroeconomics by Robert Lucas. Several studies around the Phillips curve tried to understand whether it is possible or not for policy makers to exploit the Phillips curve, that is to accept a lower level of employment, and so a higher level of unemployment, in exchange of inflation stabilisation. Nowadays there is still debate around this concept.

Soon after the publication of Phillips' paper, the idea that there was a trade-off between a strong economy and low inflation caught the imagination of academic economists and policy-makers alike. Paul Samuelson and Robert Solow wrote an influential article describing the possibilities suggested by the Phillips curve in the context of the United States. What people think of as the Phillips curve has changed substantially over time, but remains an important feature of macroeconomic analysis of economic fluctuations, with his paper on wage inflation and unemployment becoming the most cited macroeconomics title of the 20th Century. Had he lived longer, Phillips' contributions might have been worthy of a Nobel Prize in economics. He made other contributions to economics related to stabilization policy.

He returned to Australia in 1967 for a position at Australian National University which allowed him to devote half his time to Chinese studies. In 1969 the effects of his war deprivations and smoking caught up with him. He had a stroke, prompting an early retirement and return to Auckland, New Zealand, where he taught a Stage III paper "Chinese Communist Economics since 1949" for 2 years, at the University of Auckland. He died in Auckland on 4 March 1975.
