= Vladimir Privman =

Physicist (1955–2018)

- Born: January 2, 1955; Lviv, Ukraine
- Died: April 14, 2018 (aged 63); Potsdam, New York
- Education: Technion – Israel Institute of Technology
- Occupation: Physicist
- Years active: 1982–2018

Vladimir Privman (2 January 1955 – 14 April 2018) was a professor of physics at Clarkson University, where he held the Robert A. Plane Endowed Professorship. He also held joint appointments in the departments of Chemistry and Electrical and Computer Engineering. He was best known for his work on bio-inspired information processing, synthesis of colloids and nanoparticles, spintronics and quantum computing, statistical mechanics, polymer science, and chemical kinetics. He also made numerous contributions to the field of unconventional computing. In total, he authored over 250 academic papers and books.

Privman earned his doctorate in 1982 from The Technion. He completed postdoctoral work at Cornell University and Caltech before joining the faculty at Clarkson University in 1985. Early in his career, he received the Royal Society University Research Fellowship. In 2006, he became a fellow of the American Physical Society, an honor bestowed on less than one-half of one percent of the society's membership. He was recognized for his "fundamental contributions and professional leadership in statistical physics, surface, colloid and polymer science, and quantum information science."
