= Arnold Kling =

American economist (born 1954)

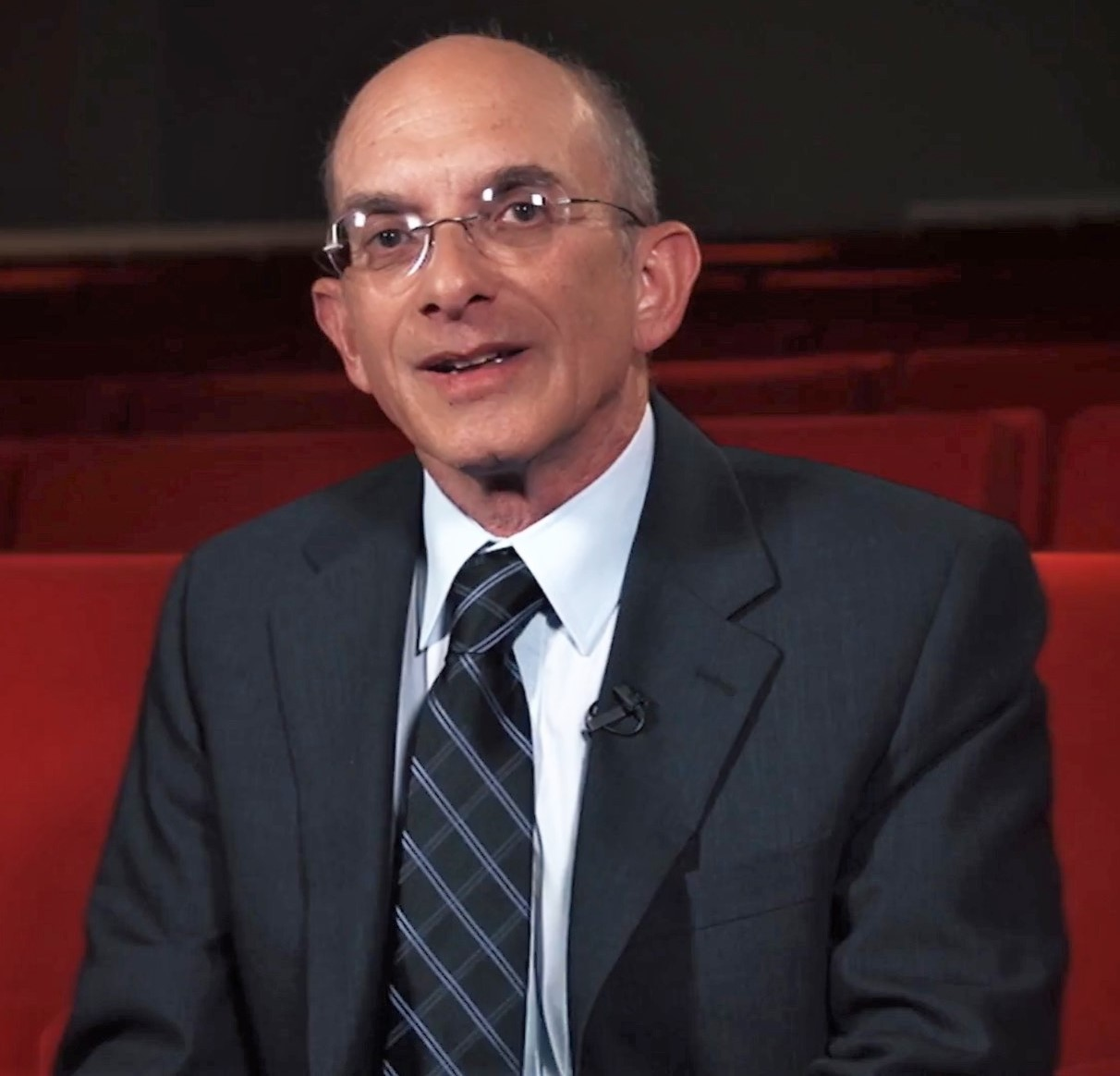
- Kling in 2017
- Born: 1954 (age 71–72)
- Education: Swarthmore College (BS); Massachusetts Institute of Technology (PhD)
- Scientific career
- Fields: Economics
- Workplaces: Federal Reserve System; Freddie Mac; Cato Institute
- Website: arnoldkling.com

Arnold Kling (born 1954) is an American economist, scholar, and blogger known for his writings on EconLog, an economics blog, along with Bryan Caplan and David R. Henderson. Kling also has his own blog, askblog, which carries the motto: "taking the most charitable views of those who disagree." The "ask" in askblog stands for "Arnold S. Kling." He is an Adjunct Scholar for the Cato Institute and is affiliated with the Mercatus Center.

Kling graduated from Swarthmore College in 1975 and received a Ph.D. in economics from Massachusetts Institute of Technology. He worked as an economist in the Federal Reserve System from 1980 to 1986. He served as a senior economist at Federal Home Loan Mortgage Corporation (Freddie Mac) from 1986 to 1994. He started, developed, and sold homefair.com between 1994 and 1999. He teaches statistics and economics at the Berman Hebrew Academy in Rockville, Maryland. In 2004 and 2005, he taught "Economics for the Citizen" at George Mason University in Fairfax, Virginia.

Kling has commented on hydraulic macroeconomics and he is also the author of a number of books on economics and politics. He identifies as a libertarian.

== Publications ==
- Under the Radar: Starting Your Net Business Without Venture Capital (2002).
- Learning Economics (2004).
- Crisis of Abundance: Rethinking How We Pay for Health Care (2006).
- Unchecked and Unbalanced: How the Discrepancy Between Knowledge and Power Caused the Financial Crisis and Threatens Democracy (2009).
- From Poverty to Prosperity: Intangible Assets, Hidden Liabilities and The Lasting Triumph over Scarcity (2009).
- Not What They Had in Mind: A History of Policies That Produced the Financial Crisis of 2008 (2015).
- Specialization and Trade: A Reintroduction to Economics (2016).
- The Three Languages of Politics: Talking Across the Political Divides (2017).
