= Fluidics =

Use of a fluid to perform analog or digital operations

A module with two input streams at the top, an AND output bucket in the middle, and an XOR output stream at the bottom.

Fluidics, or fluidic logic, is the use of a fluid to perform analog or digital operations similar to those performed with electronics.

The physical basis of fluidics is pneumatics and hydraulics, based on the theoretical foundation of fluid dynamics. The term fluidics is normally used when devices have no moving parts, so ordinary hydraulic components such as hydraulic cylinders and spool valves are not considered or referred to as fluidic devices.

A jet of fluid can be deflected by a weaker jet striking it at the side. This provides nonlinear amplification, similar to the transistor used in electronic digital logic. It is used mostly in environments where electronic digital logic would be unreliable, as in systems exposed to high levels of electromagnetic interference or ionizing radiation.

Fluidic systems can scale down to very small sizes. Microfluidics, emerging in the 1980s, works routinely with fluid volumes of 10^{−9} to 10^{−18} litres, and channel sizes of ten to hundreds of micrometres. An example of such technology is the mass produced lab-on-a-chip. Nanotechnology includes fluidics as one of its instruments. At such sizes, effects such as fluid–solid and fluid–fluid interface forces are usually highly significant.

Fluidics have also been used for military applications.

== History ==
In 1920, Nikola Tesla patented a valvular conduit or Tesla valve that works as a fluidic diode. It was a leaky diode, i.e., the reverse flow is non-zero for any applied pressure difference. Tesla's valve also had non-linear response, as its diodicity had frequency dependence. It could be used in fluid circuits, such as a full-wave rectifier, to convert AC to DC. In 1957, Billy M. Horton of the Harry Diamond Laboratories (which later became a part of the United States Army Research Laboratory) first came up with the idea for the fluidic amplifier when he realized that he could redirect the direction of flue gases using a small bellows. He proposed a theory on stream interaction, stating that one can achieve amplification by deflecting a stream of fluid with a different stream of fluid. In 1959, Horton and his associates, Dr. R. E. Bowles and Ray Warren, constructed a family of working vortex amplifiers out of soap, linoleum, and wood. Their published result caught the attention of several major industries and created a surge of interest in applying fluidics (then called fluid amplification) to sophisticated control systems, which lasted throughout the 1960s. Horton is credited for developing the first fluid amplifier control device and launching the field of fluidics. In 1961, Horton, Warren, and Bowles were among the 27 recipients to receive the first Army Research and Development Achievement Award for developing the fluid amplifier control device.

== Logic elements ==
Logic gates can be built that use water instead of electricity to power the gating function. These are reliant on being positioned in one orientation to perform correctly. An OR gate is simply two pipes being merged, and a NOT gate (inverter) consists of "A" deflecting a supply stream to produce Ā. The AND and XOR gates are sketched in the diagram. An inverter could also be implemented with the XOR gate, as A XOR 1 = Ā.

Another kind of fluidic logic is bubble logic. Bubble logic gates conserve the number of bits entering and exiting the device, because bubbles are neither produced nor destroyed in the logic operation, analogous to billiard-ball computer gates.

== Components ==
A video simulating the internal flow of a fluidic feedback oscillator.

=== Amplifiers ===
Fluidic amplifier, showing flow in both states, from U.S. patent 4,000,757.

In a fluidic amplifier, a fluid supply, which may be air, water, or hydraulic fluid, enters at the bottom. Pressure applied to the control ports C_{1} or C_{2} deflects the stream, so that it exits via either port O_{1} or O_{2}. The stream entering the control ports may be much weaker than the stream being deflected, so the device has gain.

This basic device can be used to construct other fluidic logic elements, and fluidic oscillators that can be used in analogous way as flip flops. Simple systems of digital logic can thus be built.

Fluidic amplifiers typically have bandwidths in the low kilohertz range, so systems built from them are quite slow compared to electronic devices.

=== Triodes ===
The fluidic triode, an amplification device that uses a fluid to convey the signal, has been invented, as have fluid diodes, a fluid oscillator and a variety of hydraulic "circuits," including one that has no electronic counterpart.

== Uses ==
The MONIAC Computer built in 1949 was a fluid-based analogue computer used for teaching economic principles as it could recreate complex simulations that digital computers could not at the time. Twelve to fourteen were built and acquired by businesses and teaching establishments.

The FLODAC Computer was built in 1964 as a proof of concept fluid-based digital computer.

Fluidic components appear in some hydraulic and pneumatic systems, including some automotive automatic transmissions. As electronic digital logic has become more accepted in industrial control, the role of fluidics in industrial control has declined.

In the consumer market, fluidically controlled products are increasing in both popularity and presence, installed in items ranging from toy spray guns through shower heads and hot tub jets; all provide oscillating or pulsating streams of air or water. Logic-enabled textiles for applications in wearable technology has also been researched.

Fluid logic can be used to create a valve with no moving parts such as in some anaesthetic machines.

Fluidic oscillators were used in the design of pressure-triggered, 3D printable, emergency ventilators for the COVID-19 pandemic.

Fluidic amplifiers are used to generate ultrasound for non-destructive testing by quickly switching pressurized air from one outlet to another.

A fluidic sound amplification system has been demonstrated in a synagogue, where regular electronic sound amplification can not be used for religious reasons.

Fluidic injection is being researched for use in aircraft to control direction, in two ways: circulation control and thrust vectoring. In both, larger more complex mechanical parts are replaced by fluidic systems, in which larger forces in fluids are diverted by smaller jets or flows of fluid intermittently, to change the direction of vehicles. In circulation control, near the trailing edges of wings, aircraft flight control systems such as ailerons, elevators, elevons, flaps, and flaperons are replaced by openings, usually rows of holes, or elongated slots, which emit fluid flows. In thrust vectoring, in jet engine nozzles, swiveling parts are replaced by openings which inject fluid flows into jets. Such systems divert thrust via fluid effects. Tests show that air forced into a jet engine exhaust stream can deflect thrust up to 15 degrees. In such uses, fluidics is desirable for lower: mass, cost (up to 50% less), drag (up to 15% less during use), inertia (for faster, stronger control response), complexity (mechanically simpler, fewer or no moving parts or surfaces, less maintenance), and radar cross section for stealth. This will likely be used in many unmanned aerial vehicles (UAVs), 6th generation fighter aircraft, and ships.

As of 2023, at least two countries are known to be researching fluidic control. In Britain, BAE Systems has tested two fluidically controlled unmanned aircraft, one starting in 2010 named Demon, and another with the University of Manchester starting in 2017 named MAGMA. In the United States, the Defense Advanced Research Projects Agency (DARPA) program named Control of Revolutionary Aircraft with Novel Effectors (CRANE) seeks "... to design, build, and flight test a novel X-plane that incorporates active flow control (AFC) as a primary design consideration. ... In 2023, the aircraft received its official designation as X-65", or more fully: Aurora X-65 CRANE. In winter 2024, construction began, at Boeing subsidiary Aurora Flight Sciences. Flight tests were to start in summer 2025, but moved to 2027.

Octobot is a proof of concept soft-bodied autonomous robot containing a microfluidic logic circuit, developed by researchers at Harvard University's Wyss Institute for Biologically Inspired Engineering in 2016.

== See also ==
- Water integrator
- Bio-MEMS
- MONIAC
- Unconventional computing
