= BAE Systems Demon =

Experimental unmanned aerial vehicle

Demon
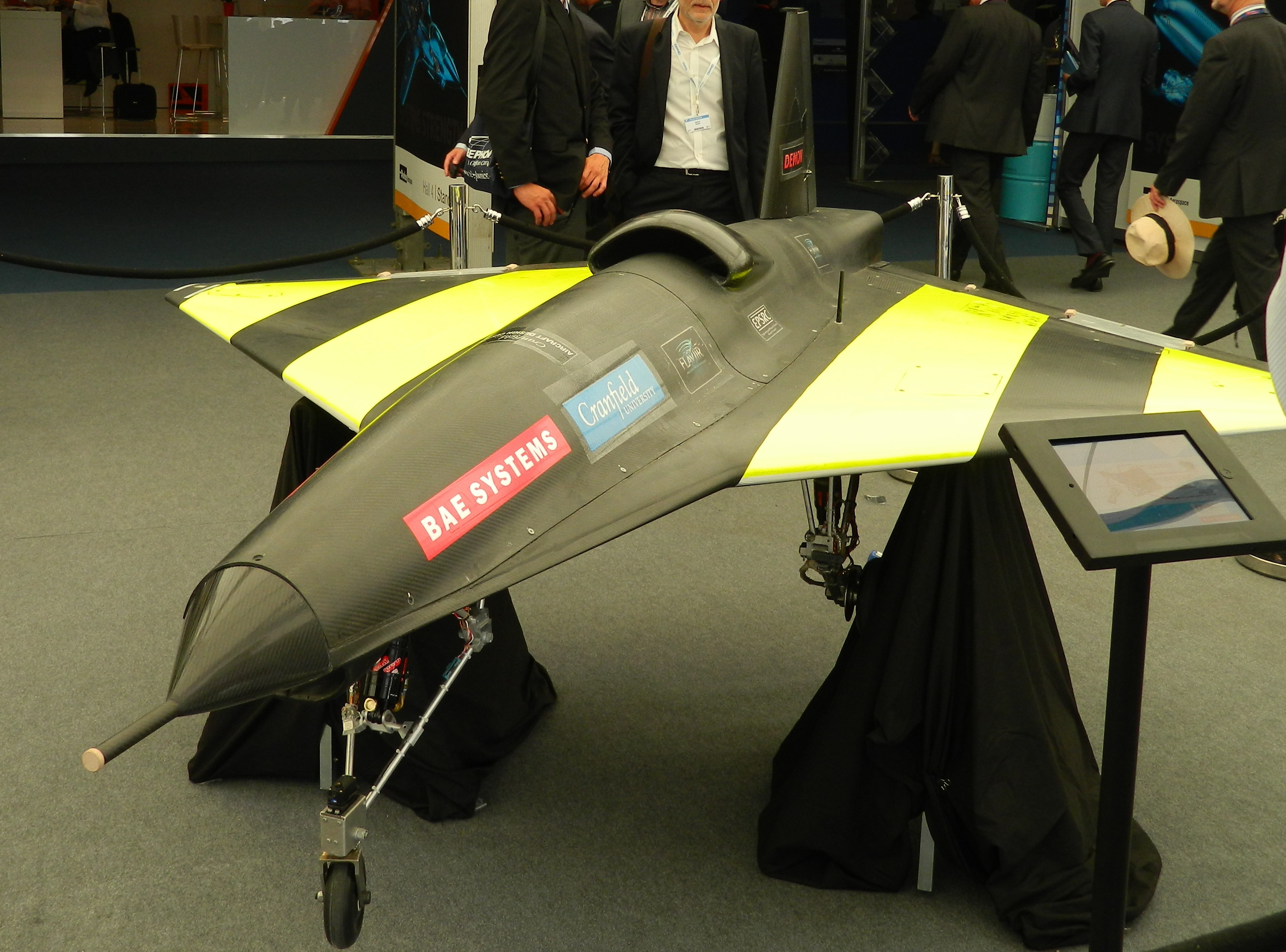

General information
- Type: Unmanned aerial vehicle
- Manufacturer: BAE Systems
- Designer: BAE Systems, Cranfield University
- Number built: 1

History
- First flight: 17 September 2010

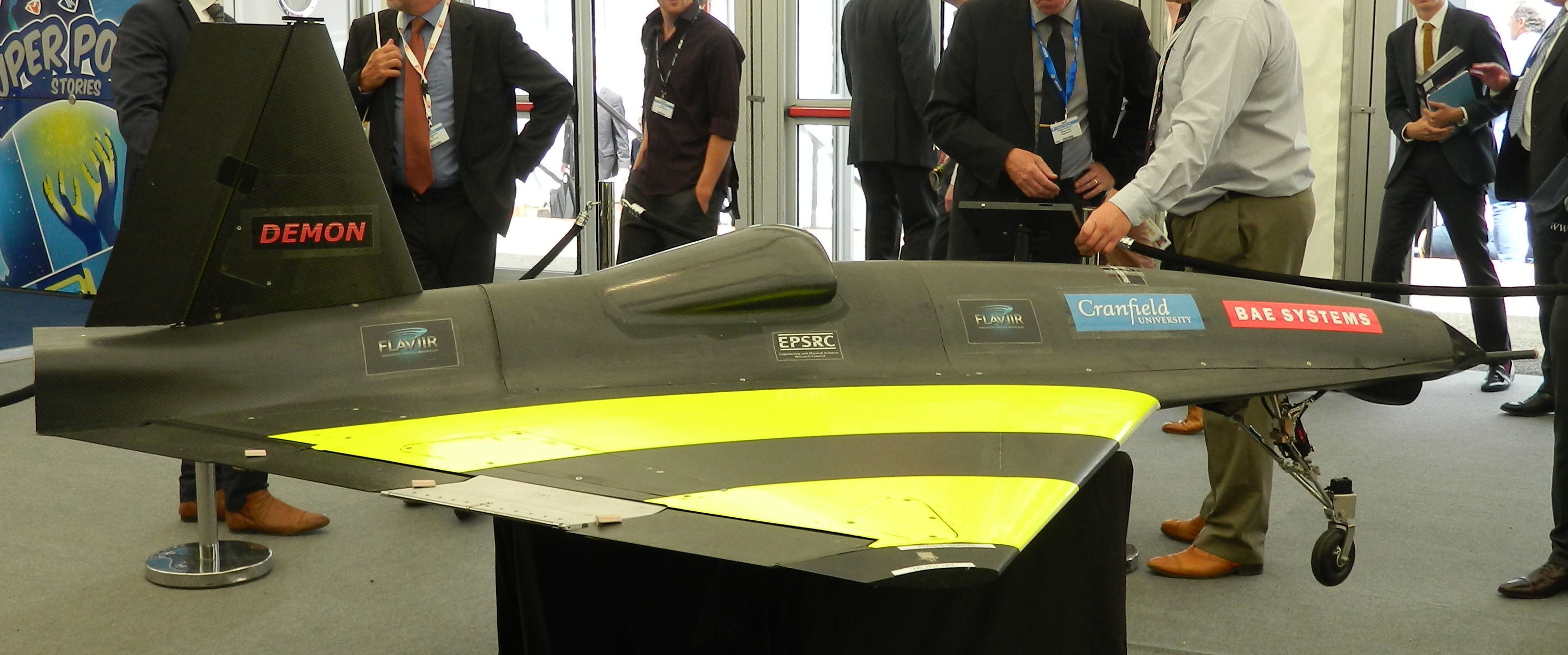
Demon on display at 2014 Farnborough Air Show

The Demon is an experimental unmanned aerial vehicle (UAV) developed and manufactured by British defence conglomerate BAE Systems. It has been referred to as being the world's first "flapless" aircraft.

The Demon was developed as a demonstrator for the flapless air vehicle integrated industrial research (FLAVIIR) programme. Developed from the conventional BAE Systems Eclipse UAV, it was used to trial an unconventional aircraft flight control system over the course of two years. Various other technologies were also experimented with, including modular and cost-reduction techniques. On 17 September 2010, the Demon conducted its first flight without using any conventional flight control surfaces. It has been speculated that the technology has potential applications in both civilian and military aviation.

== Development ==
During the early 21st century, British defence conglomerate BAE Systems initiated a five-year research programme known as flapless air vehicle integrated industrial research (FLAVIIR). This effort had a declared budget of £6.5 million, which was financed by both BAE Systems and the UK's Engineering and Physical Sciences Research Council. It had the aim of developing and testing a new aerodynamic circulation-based aircraft flight control system, manipulating airflow via non-traditional means; unlike most prior efforts, it sought to bring technologies together to form a functional system rather than develop isolated elements. Participants in the programme included various British aeronautics companies, specialists, and academic institutions included Cranfield University and nine other British universities.

During August 2007, an American patent was filed for elements of this new control system concept; it was granted during July 2011. As development proceeded, it was decided to produce an experimental unmanned air vehicle to demonstrate manoeuvring without the aid of conventional flight control surfaces. The conventional BAE Systems Eclipse was selected as the basis for the demonstrator. Ahead of the flight test programme, it was subjected to various ground-based tests, including the use of wind tunnels and scale models.

The Demon participated in a two-year demonstration programme, during which the team studied the UAV's performance throughout its flight envelope. On 17 September 2010, the Demon performed its first flight in which all of its conventional control surfaces were deactivated during a portion of the flight off the coast of Cumbria, having flown out of Barrow/Walney Island Airport. Richard Williams, BAE's programme director for future capability, stated of the occasion: "I feel sure I have witnessed a significant moment in aviation history".

In late 2010, BAE Systems stated that the Demon shall not be followed up by a direct production aircraft, but its technologies would be filtered through to other platforms instead. Aerospace periodical Flight International speculated that this unique circulation control system could one day be employed in civilian aviation to reduce the size of the wing on widebody airliners. Its developers have stated their hopes that the new technology could be used to reduce noise, cut fuel consumption, and lower maintenance costs. In terms of military applications, the technology might enable future combat aircraft to achieve greater levels of stealth than conventionally equipped counterparts.

== Design ==
The BAE Systems Demon is an experimental unmanned aerial vehicle (UAV). In terms of its basic configuration, it is a blended wing-body aircraft, possessing an approximate wingspan of 8-foot (2.5m) and a weight of 200 lb (90 kg). In flight, it could attain a maximum speed of 150 kn. It was outfitted with a conventional flap-based flight control system which can be switched on and off during flight, allowing the aircraft to alternate between its experimental and conventional control system.

The Demon was built to flight test a novel aerodynamic control system. This system uses a combination of engine exhaust gas, which is redirected using a thrust vectoring nozzle, and bleed air, which is precisely controlled to provide control over the same aerodynamic forces that would be traditionally provided by numerous flight control surfaces, including flaps, ailerons and elevators. Termed fluidic flight controls, the arrangement used on the Demon reportedly functions by directing air from a rectangular exhaust nozzle over upper and lower surfaces, using the Coandă effect to establish control over pitch. For roll control, bleed air is blown over a Coanda surface installed on the trailing edge of the wing. By controlling boundary layer conditions, the fluidic controls can also generate either greater lift or drag during the take-off and landing phases of flight.

Beyond the novel flight control system, the Demon was used to trial various other technologies, such as the manufacture and assembly of a fully bonded structure. This structure possessed low cost material reinforcing features, which reportedly achieved roughly 50% cost savings over the use of conventional manufacturing processes. A key goal of the demonstrator was to trial cheaper, more modular UAV technology, exploring designs have been generated through cross-disciplinary interactions.

== See also ==
- Aircraft flight control system
- Blown wing

Aircraft of comparable role, configuration, and era

- Ball-Bartoe Jetwing
- Hunting H.126
- English Electric P.10

Related lists

- List of unmanned aerial vehicles
