= Hydraulic macroeconomics =

Informal term in macroeconomics

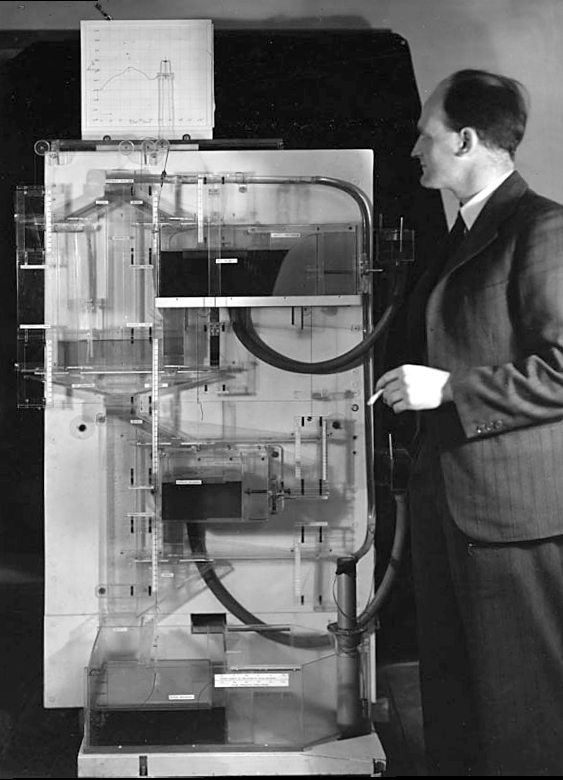
Phillips with MONIAC

Hydraulic macroeconomics is an informal characterization of certain types of macroeconomic study assuming aggregate social wealth (demand or supply) as somewhat smooth, constant and homogeneous. The term was first introduced as hydraulic Keynesianism by Alan Coddington in classification of theoretical research methodologies in Keynesian economics.

Hydraulics is the science and engineering of the mechanical properties of liquids. Macroeconomics is the study of the performance and structure of an entire economy. Hydraulic macroeconomics is, essentially, a study of the economy that treats money as a form of liquid that circulates through the economic plumbing.

William Phillips, an economist and creator of the Phillips curve, invented the MONIAC, a hydraulic computer which simulated the British economy. This is the inspiration for the term. Even earlier, in 1891, Irving Fisher built a hydraulic machine for calculating equilibrium prices.

Initially, the phrase, "hydraulic macroeconomics", was associated with Keynesian economic models that did not display household or firm optimization.
