= Water integrator =

Early Soviet analog computer

Water Integrator
- Released: 1936; 90 years ago
- Discontinued: Late 1980s

The Water Integrator (Russian: Гидравлический интегратор Gidravlicheskiy integrator) was an early analog computer built in the Soviet Union in 1936 by Vladimir Sergeevich Lukyanov. It functioned by careful manipulation of water through a room full of interconnected pipes and pumps. The water level in various chambers (with precision to fractions of a millimeter) represented stored numbers, and the rate of flow between them represented mathematical operations. This machine was capable of solving inhomogeneous differential equations.

The first versions of Lukyanov's integrators were rather experimental, made of tin and glass tubes, and each integrator could be used to solve only one problem. In the 1930s it was the only computer in the Soviet Union for solving partial differential equations.

In 1941, Lukyanov created a hydraulic integrator of modular design, which made it possible to assemble a machine for solving various problems. Two-dimensional and three-dimensional hydraulic integrators were designed.

In 1949–1955, an integrator in the form of standard unified units was developed at the NIISCHETMASH Institute. In 1955, the Ryazan plant of calculating and analytical machines began the serial production of integrators with the factory brand name "IGL" (russian: Интегратор Гидравлический Лукьянова – integrator of the Lukyanov hydraulic system). Integrators were widely distributed, delivered to Czechoslovakia, Poland, Bulgaria and China.

A water integrator was used in the design of the Karakum Canal in the 1940s, and the construction of the Baikal–Amur Mainline in the 1970s. Water analog computers were used in the Soviet Union until the 1980s for large-scale modelling. They were used in geology, mine construction, metallurgy, rocket production and other fields.

Currently, two hydraulic integrators are kept in the Polytechnic Museum in Moscow.

== See also ==
- History of computing hardware
- MONIAC Computer
- Fluidics
