= Te Rehunga =

Coordinates: 40.21°S 176.01°E

Te Rehunga is a rural locality located in the Tararua District, part of the Manawatū-Whanganui Region of New Zealand.

Known today for its sheep and dairy farming, Te Rehunga is adjacent to the agricultural service towns of Dannevirke and Woodville, and borders the eastern slopes of the Ruahine Range. Local education is provided by Ruahine primary school, with older students attending the nearby Dannevirke High School. The other primary school in Te Rehunga, Rua Roa, was closed in 2003 and the student population transferred to Ruahine School.

== Local history ==
The area was settled originally by Māori iwi (tribes), primarily members of the Rangitāne and Ngāti Kahungunu. A nearby marae, or "meeting house", is the famous Makirikiri Aotea Marae in Dannevirke. There is a strong Māori presence in Te Rehunga, and the Māori continue to play a vital role in the culture and community at large. European settlement in the region began with the arrival of Scandinavian settlers, brought in to begin logging the old-growth timber in the region known as the "Seventy-Mile Bush" (from Norsewood south to what is now Eketāhuna). To this day, Te Rehunga retains some significant vestiges of the original Danish settlement, including descendants of the Danish and Norwegian families.

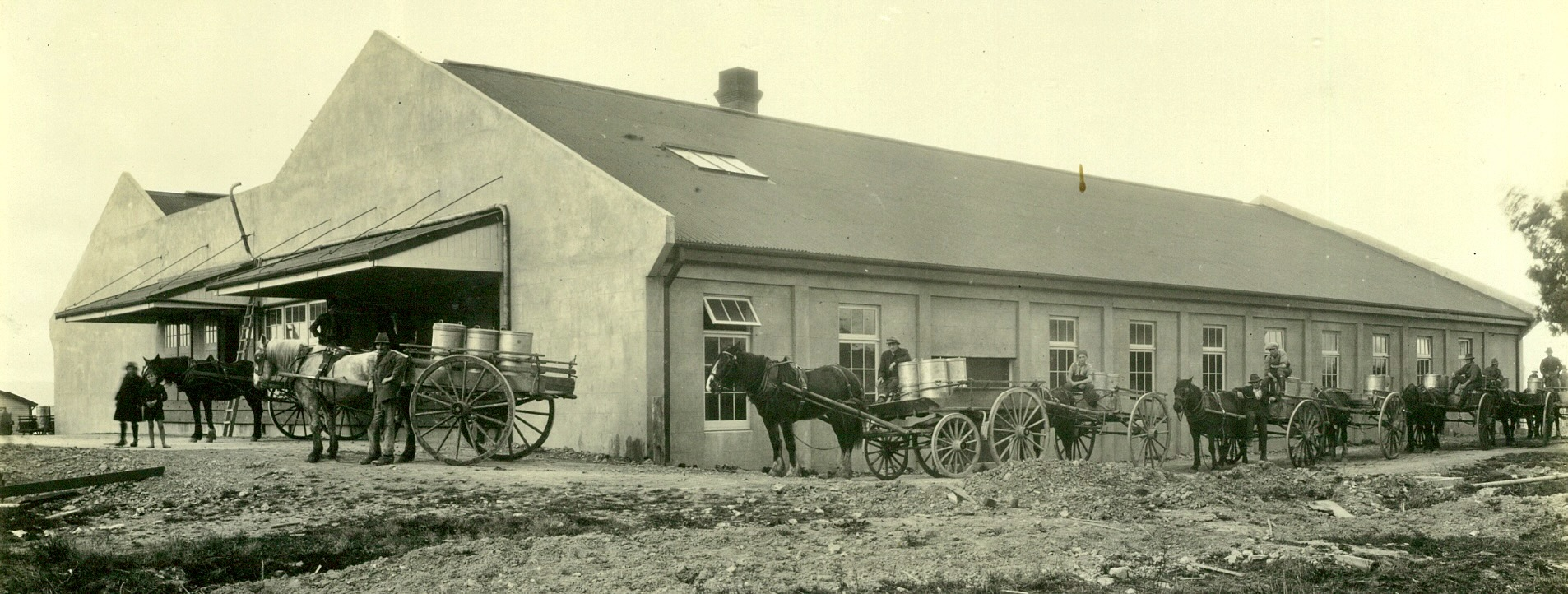
Tamaki dairy about 1924

Arthur C. Webber started a creamery at Te Rehunga in 1905, which he sold to Tamaki Co-operative Dairy Co in 1909. It was replaced by a larger factory in 1923. By 1959 it had become Tamaki-Kiritaki Co-operative Dairy Co, and by 1971 Ruahine Co-op Dairy Co Ltd, a name remaining in 2025. Five staff houses were built in 1953.

== Today ==
The Te Rehunga area, although affected by the expected closure of the nearby PPCS Oringi meat-processing plant, continues to slowly progress economically, due in part to its proximity to the Ruahine Forest Parks, as well as adjacent to the busy SH2 national highway linking Auckland and Wellington via Hawke's Bay.
