= Network computing =

Network computing refers to computers or nodes working together over a network.

Network computing may also mean:

- Cloud computing, a kind of Internet-based computing that provides shared processing resources and data to devices on demand
- Distributed computing
- Virtual Network Computing
