= Walk Again Project =

International non-profit consortium

- Formation: 2009; 17 years ago
- Founder: Miguel Nicolelis
- Type: Nonprofit
- Purpose: Scientific research
- Members: United States; Switzerland; Germany; Brazil
- Website: www.walkagainproject.org

Walk Again Project is an international, non-profit consortium led by Miguel Nicolelis, created in 2009 in a partnership between Duke University and the IINN/ELS, where researchers come together to find neuro-rehabilitation treatments for spinal cord injuries, which pioneered the development and use of the brain–machine interface, including its non-invasive version, with an EEG.

== History ==
Nicolelis, a Brazilian neuroscientist working at Duke University, who had been proposing the use of BMI in his laboratory since 2006, but had been exploring this area since 1999. (Note: In his 2019 compilation, Nicolelis describes that the July 1999 article launched the field of BMI studies, causing a sensation in the scientific community, being the first example of the brain interacting with a machine (in this case, a lever), and the first experimental demonstration of an BMI. In 2000, in a review of his research, Nicolelis used the term "brain-machine interface" for the first time to describe the connection between living brains and artificial devices. In 2001, in the article "Actions from Thoughts", Nicolelis coined the term "hybrid brain-machine interfaces". and that same year he was described by the MIT as a leader in the field of BMI.) He had demonstrated the viability of BMI alongside scientist John Chapin, in 2008, together with Gordon Cheng, in an experiment where they tested the first continental BMI, where an ape in North Carolina controlled a robot in Kyoto. This was a precursor of the Walk Again Project. Previously, in 2000, Nicolelis had already demonstrated, in a publication in Nature, the possibility of a computer decoding an ape's brain signals in order to move a robotic arm. The project, which began in 2009, is a partnership between institutions in the US, Switzerland, Germany, and Brazil.

In one of its first steps, published in 2011, the project team made a monkey control a mechanical arm and receive tactile information from this tool, including in the virtual world, with the team's research being welcomed "as an important advance by the scientific community", according to Veja magazine. That year, in his book "Beyond boundaries", Nicolelis described his plan to make a patient take the opening kick of the FIFA World Cup, in a project budgeted at R$33 million at the time (U$S 15,305,489.56 in 2013), and funded by Finep.

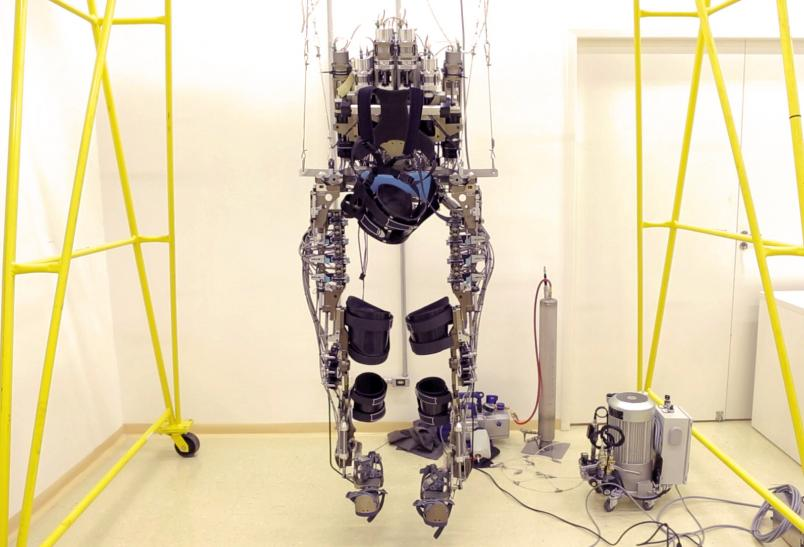
The BRA-Santos Dumont exoskeleton

In 2012, in the process of creating the BRA-Santos Dumont exoskeleton for the 2014 FIFA World Cup, (Note: In the book "Beyond boundaries," Nicolelis stated that the exoskeleton was created by Gordon Cheng.) the project team recorded 1847 neurons simultaneously, something, until then, unprecedented. The next research project saw mice being able to sense tactile information from infrared light, as a possible new form of BMI communication. The following year, the project received authorization to test the exoskeleton in Brazil, with volunteers from the Association for Assistance to Disabled Children testing the equipment since the beginning of November 2013.

When he returned to Brazil for the project, Nicolelis found that the patients did not want to undergo surgery as a way of regaining movement. This led his team to develop non-invasive techniques that were able to help patients chronically, something, according to the scientist, "that had never been done in decades of research and treatment of spinal cord injuries."

In 2013, the project team revealed that they had been able to make two rhesus monkeys control two virtual arms, using only their thoughts. The research was published in Science Translational Medicine. In March 2014 the two exoskeletons were already in Brazil.

The initial contact with FIFA was made in 2012, but the plan to give the inaugural kick, which would even involve the patient getting up from his wheelchair and crossing 25 meters of the pitch, was abandoned by the entity. Nicolelis has been aware of the time limitation since March. 2014. In the end the demonstration, carried out by the patient Juliano Alves Pinto during the 2014 FIFA World Cup opening ceremony, was reduced to just three seconds on the world network, which was the subject of controversy.

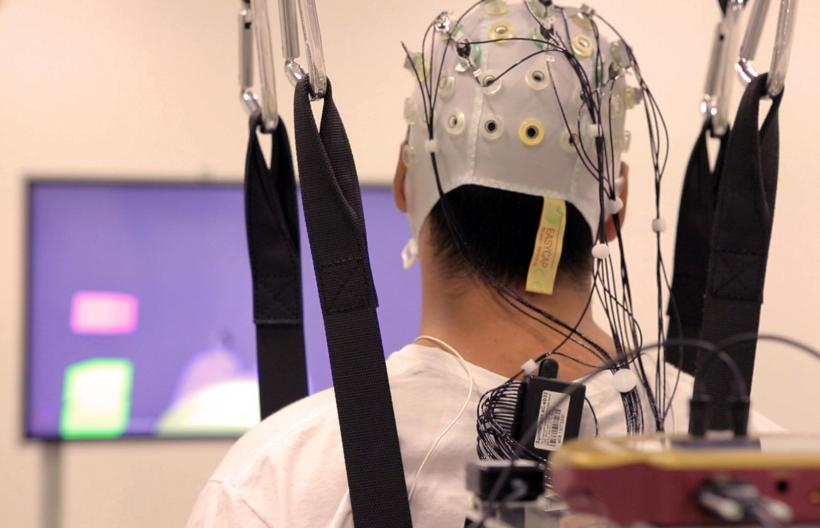
Patient wearing the non-invasive BMI, 2014.

The Walk Again team, made up of 150–156 people for the World Cup, had no control over image production, but the rest of the project was carried out successfully. The "MIT Technology Review" listed the exoskeleton as one of the "main failures" in technology in 2014, something Nicolelis refuted, while "The Verge" identified him as "one of the 50 world personalities of 2014".

On March 3, 2016, the team demonstrated the use of BMI on apes so that they could move wheelchairs using only their thoughts. On August 11 of the same year, a new study was published in Scientific Reports. Eight paraplegic patients, who had lost all movement in their lower limbs due to spinal cord injuries, experienced a partial neurological recovery after 12 months of training with virtual reality, a robot, and an exoskeleton.

The experiment described above involved 6 men and 2 women: in four cases, the patients became "partially paralyzed"; a 32-year-old woman who had been paralyzed for more than a decade became able to walk with support after 13 months. One of the two women was able to become pregnant after restoring sensation inside and outside the body, as well as some men regaining sexual ability. The patients reported that the treatment had improved their quality of life.

The researchers were surprised by the improvements, since the damage to the spinal cord would have prevented the brain from communicating with the rest of the body. Nicolelis then theorized, still without evidence via imaging tests, that the immersion and mental focus on the training would have stimulated brain plasticity, possibly causing the brain to transmit information through what remained of the nerves.

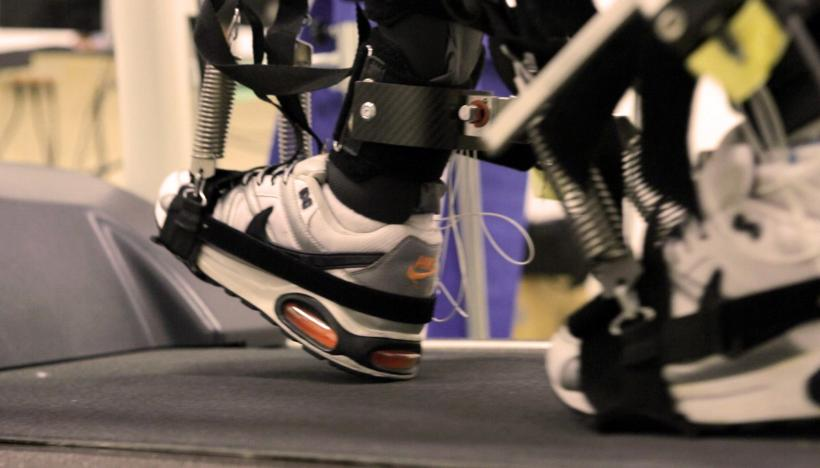
Feet of a patient using the exoskeleton

In 2018, in an article published in PLOS One, the project demonstrated seven complete paraplegic patients becoming partial paraplegics due to the 28-month-long training with the BMI. In 2019, in a study published in Scientific Reports, three paraplegic patients tested the "brain–muscle interface", where small electrical charges in their legs helped them to move without an exoskeleton. In a study published on May 1, 2021, in Scientific Reports, two patients suffering from chronic paraplegia were shown to be able to walk on 70% of their own weight, in addition to taking 4580 steps, also with the help of non-invasive techniques.

A study published in 2022 demonstrated the superior clinical effect that the use of non-invasive BMI has compared to putting patients on robots that don't have the same technology. Between 2023 and 2024, Nicolelis began to criticize the company Neuralink, founded by two of his former students. He raised ethical concerns about how the company works, as well as criticizing the way they advertised as new a type of research that Nicolelis' team had already carried out over the previous two decades. Also in 2023, Nicolelis announced the creation of the Nicolelis Institute for Advanced Brain Studies, which aims to bring low-cost solutions, based on BMI, to the treatment of neurological and psychiatric diseases for 1 billion people. The first hub will be created in Milan, Italy, developed with the IRCCS San Raffaele Hospital and the Vita-Salute San Raffaele University, as announced in March 2024.

In 2025, the work of the Walk Again Project and Xuanwu Hospital was revealed, presenting the Walk Again Neurorehabilitation Protocol. Using non-invasive systems and virtual reality, a group of 19 patients with complete paraplegia, divided between control and main groups, received treatment for 9 months. After this period, 50% of patients went from complete to partial paraplegia, with one patient walking without assistance, in addition to observing a reversal of cortical atrophy.

== Other research ==
Unrelated to "Walking Again", on July 9, 2015, two studies were published in Scientific Reports, demonstrating brain–brain interaction, inside the concept of Brainet.

== Awards ==
In 2010, Nicolelis won the U$S 2.5 million prize from the National Institute of Health, becoming the first Brazilian to receive this award. For his research with BMI, in 2016 Nicolelis won the Daniel E. Noble Award in the category of emerging technologies.

== Works ==
In 2019, the laboratory responsible for the project published a two-volume compilation of 20 years of scientific articles by the group, which can be downloaded free of charge.

- 20 Years of Brain–Machine Interface Research. Nicolelis Lab Series. Vol. 1. 2019. p. 452.
- 20 Years of Brain–Machine Interface Research. Nicolelis Lab Series. Vol. 2. 2019. p. 436.

== See also ==
- Brain–computer interface
- Brain–brain interface
- Spinal cord injury research
- Rehabilitation in spinal cord injury
