= Sidarta Ribeiro =

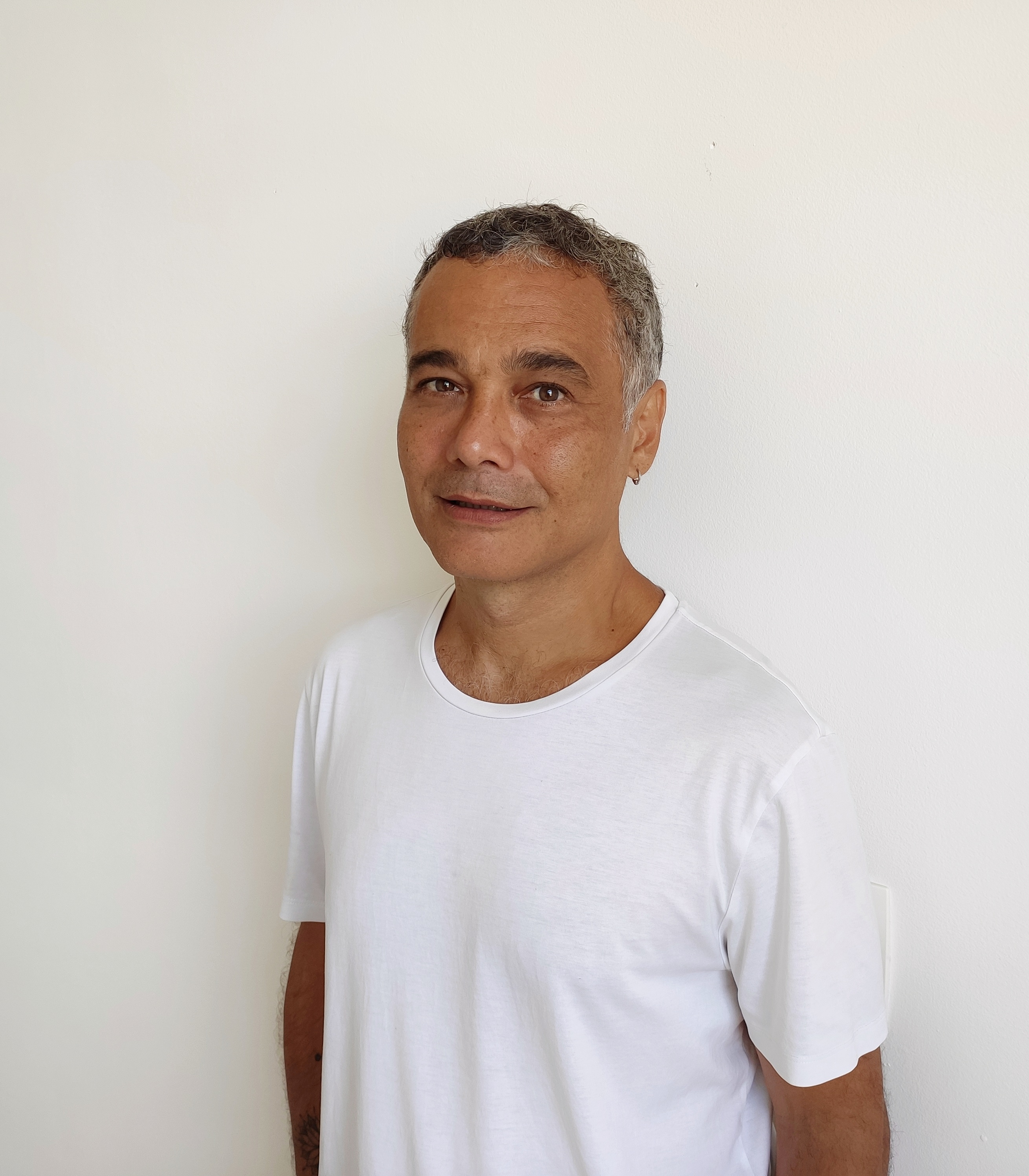
Sidarta Ribeiro, in 2021

Sidarta Tollendal Gomes Ribeiro (Brasília, April 16, 1971) is a Brazilian neuroscientist, writer, science communicator, and deputy director of the Brain Institute at Universidade Federal do Rio Grande do Norte (UFRN), which he joined in 2008 as full professor.

Sidarta is the author of The Oracle of Night: The History and Science of Dreaming, his fifth book (released in English on August 17, 2021), and a contributor for Folha de S.Paulo, Brazil´s largest newspaper.

Member of the Latin American Academy of Sciences (ACAL) since 2016, he is associate editor of the journals PLoS One, Frontiers in Integrative Neuroscience and Frontiers In Psychology - Language Sciences. He is a member of the Council of the Sociedade brasileira para o Progresso da Ciência (SBPC), the Steering Committee of the Latin American School for Educational, Cognitive and Neural Sciences [1] and the Center for Research, Innovation and Education in Neuromathematics (NeuroMat).[3] He served as secretary of the Brazilian Society of Neuroscience and Behavior (SBNeC) in the triennium 2009-2011 and was a member of the Brazilian committee of the Pew Latin American Fellows Program in the Biomedical Sciences between 2011 and 2015.

== Academic degrees ==
- Bachelor of Biological Sciences by Universidade de Brasília (1989–1993)
- Master's in Biophysics by Universidade Federal do Rio de Janeiro (1994)
- Ph.D. in Animal Behavior by Rockefeller University (1995–2000)
- Postdoctoral research in Neurophysiology with a "Pew Latin-American Fellowship in the Biomedical Sciences" at Duke University (2000–2005)

== Fields of research ==
- Sleep, dreaming and memory
- Immediate genes and neuroplasticity
- Vocal communication in birds and primates
- Symbolic competence in non-human animals
- Computational psychiatry
- Neuroscience applied to education
- Psychedelics and drug policy

== Awards ==
- Medical Innovation Award: Innovation in Diagnostic Medicine Category, Abril & Dasa, 2018
- SUS Award Best Published Paper Category, Ministry of Health (Brazil), 2017
- Celso Furtado Award, Ministry of National Integration (Brazil), 2017
- Latin American Research Award, Google, 2017
- “Exemplifying the Mission of the International Mind, Brain and Education Society, International Mind” Award, Brain and Education Society (IMBES), 2014
- Trip Transformadores Award: "Sleep" Category, TRIP Editora, 2007
- Pew Latin American Fellowship in the Biomedical Sciences, Pew Foundation, 2001
- Guimarães Rosa Award, Radio France Internationale, 1996

== The Oracle of Night ==
In his book The Oracle of Night: The History and Science of Dream, Sidarta Ribeiro starts from the questions "what are dreams and what is their role in the evolution of human consciousness?" To answer, he articulates several narratives: the biological evolution of sleep and oneiric phenomena, the cultural history of dream interpretations and their social functions, psychological and psychoanalytic investigations and theories, and recent discoveries of neuroscience.

Biology, history, anthropology, studies of mythology, religion and art are combined in this work, accessible to laymen willing to a careful reading of passages of a more strictly scientific nature.

Based on a large and diverse body of evidence, the author unfolds the vision suggested in the book's title: that dreams are a "probabilistic oracle" in which memories are rearranged to predict and rehearse possible futures, anticipating risks and opportunities.

The Oracle of Night describes dreams as an essential feature in the evolutionary process that made Homo sapiens an exceptionally versatile and inventive animal – a resource that needs to be rediscovered in this historical moment of great challenges for the future of the planet and the human species.

== Gathering neuroscientists in Natal ==
In the 1990s, Sidarta Ribeiro and fellow neuroscientists Claudio Mello, Sergio Neuenschwander, Antonio Pereira, Cecília Hedin-Pereira, Claudia Vargas and Mário Fiorani, began the repatriation project that gave origin to the International Institute for Neuroscience of Natal (ELS-IINN), founded by Sidarta Ribeiro, Miguel Nicolelis and Claudio Mello in 2003. This initiative was promoted by the public sector, with decisive support from the Ministries of Education and Science. As a consequence, the Federal University of Rio Grande do Norte (UFRN) undertook the creation of a world-class neuroscience research center in Natal as part of its strategic plan for future development. In order to implement the project in a solid manner, the university engaged since 2008 in a major recruitment effort, publicized internationally in venues such as Nature and Science magazine, to recruit a group of faculty with international training in some of the most prestigious research centers in the world. The group currently includes 18 faculty duly selected by public contests: Adriano Tort, Antonio Pereira, Maria Bernardete de Sousa, Claudio Queiroz, Diego Laplagne, Draulio de Araujo, Lia Bevilaqua, Katarina Leão, Kerstin Schmidt, Marcos Costa, Martin Cammarota, Richardson Leão, Rodrigo Pereira, Sandro de Souza, Sergio Neuenschwander, Sidarta Ribeiro, and Tarciso Velho. On May 13, 2011, Sidarta Ribeiro took part in the inauguration of the Brain Institute (Instituto do Cérebro - ICe), together with Ivonildo do Rego and Angela Paiva, former and current Presidents of UFRN, academic leaders, faculty, technicians and students. On July 26, 2011, the newspaper Folha de S.Paulo published an article reporting the split between Miguel Nicolelis and the faculty of UFRN recruited for the Natal Neuroscience project. The main reason cited for the split was the lack of access of the University’s faculty to the equipment at IINN-ELS. This information was confirmed by Science magazine. An article in the Brazilian magazine Piauí further clarified that the faculty exodus from the ELS-IINN was caused by widespread dissatisfaction with Nicolelis’ management.

== Works ==
=== Selected scientific publications ===
- The entropic tongue: Disorganization of natural language under LSD. Sanz C, Pallavicini C, Carrillo F, Zamberlan F, Sigman M, Mota N, Copelli M, Ribeiro S, Nutt D, Carhart-Harris R, Tagliazucchi E.Conscious Cogn. 2021 Jan;87:103070. doi: 10.1016/j.concog.2020.103070.
- Neuroscience and education: prime time to build the bridge. Sigman M, Peña M, Goldin AP, Ribeiro S.Nat Neurosci. 2014 Apr;17(4):497-502. doi: 10.1038/nn.3672.
- Structural differences between REM and non-REM dream reports assessed by graph analysis. Martin JM, Andriano DW, Mota NB, Mota-Rolim SA, Araújo JF, Solms M, Ribeiro S.PLoS One. 2020 Jul 23;15(7):e0228903. doi: 10.1371/journal.pone.0228903.
- Memory corticalization triggered by REM sleep: mechanisms of cellular and systems consolidation. Almeida-Filho DG, Queiroz CM, Ribeiro S.Cell Mol Life Sci. 2018 Oct;75(20):3715-3740. doi: 10.1007/s00018-018-2886-9.
- Dreaming during the Covid-19 pandemic: Computational assessment of dream reports reveals mental suffering related to fear of contagion. Mota NB, Weissheimer J, Ribeiro M, de Paiva M, Avilla-Souza J, Simabucuru G, Chaves MF, Cecchi L, Cirne J, Cecchi G, Rodrigues C, Copelli M, Ribeiro S.PLoS One. 2020 Nov 30;15(11):e0242903. doi: 10.1371/journal.pone.0242903.
- The History of Writing Reflects the Effects of Education on Discourse Structure: Implications for Literacy, Orality, Psychosis and the Axial Age. Pinheiro S, Mota NB, Sigman M, Fernández-Slezak D, Guerreiro A, Tófoli LF, Cecchi G, Copelli M, Ribeiro S.Trends Neurosci Educ. 2020 Dec;21:100142. doi: 10.1016/j.tine.2020.100142.
- The onset of data-driven mental archeology. Ribeiro S.Front Neurosci. 2014 Aug 13;8:249. doi: 10.3389/fnins.2014.00249.
- Psychosis and the Control of Lucid Dreaming. Mota NB, Resende A, Mota-Rolim SA, Copelli M, Ribeiro S.Front Psychol. 2016 Mar 9;7:294. doi: 10.3389/fpsyg.2016.00294.
- Post-class naps boost declarative learning in a naturalistic school setting. Cabral T, Mota NB, Fraga L, Copelli M, McDaniel MA, Ribeiro S.npj Sci Learn. 2018 Aug 21;3:14. doi: 10.1038/s41539-018-0031-z.
- Capacity building: Architects of South American science. Arzt E, Orjeda G, Nobre C, Castilla JC, Barañao L, Ribeiro S, Bifano C, Krieger JE, Guerrero PC.Nature. 2014 Jun 12;510(7504):209-12. doi: 10.1038/510209a.
- Synaptic Homeostasis and Restructuring across the Sleep-Wake Cycle. Blanco W, Pereira CM, Cota VR, Souza AC, Rennó-Costa C, Santos S, Dias G, Guerreiro AM, Tort AB, Neto AD, Ribeiro S.PLoS Comput Biol. 2015 May 28;11(5):e1004241. doi: 10.1371/journal.pcbi.1004241.
- Dopaminergic control of sleep-wake states. Dzirasa K, Ribeiro S, Costa R, Santos LM, Lin SC, Grosmark A, Sotnikova TD, Gainetdinov RR, Caron MG, Nicolelis MA.J Neurosci. 2006 Oct 11;26(41):10577-89. doi: 10.1523/JNEUROSCI.1767-06.2006.
- The maturation of speech structure in psychosis is resistant to formal education. Mota NB, Sigman M, Cecchi G, Copelli M, Ribeiro S.npj Schizophr. 2018 Dec 7;4(1):25. doi: 10.1038/s41537-018-0067-3.
- 3,4-methylenedioxymethamphetamine (MDMA)-assisted psychotherapy for victims of sexual abuse with severe post-traumatic stress disorder: an open label pilot study in Brazil. Jardim AV, Jardim DV, Chaves BR, Steglich M, Ot'alora G M, Mithoefer MC, da Silveira DX, Tófoli LF, Ribeiro S, Matthews R, Doblin R, Schenberg EE.Braz J Psychiatry. 2021 Mar-Apr;43(2):181-185. doi: 10.1590/1516-4446-2020-0980.
- Short term changes in the proteome of human cerebral organoids induced by 5-MeO-DMT. Dakic V, Minardi Nascimento J, Costa Sartore R, Maciel RM, de Araujo DB, Ribeiro S, Martins-de-Souza D, Rehen SK.Sci Rep. 2017 Oct 9;7(1):12863. doi: 10.1038/s41598-017-12779-5.
- Cyclic alternation of quiet and active sleep states in the octopus. Medeiros SLS, Paiva MMM, Lopes PH, Blanco W, Lima FD, Oliveira JBC, Medeiros IG, Sequerra EB, de Souza S, Leite TS, Ribeiro S.iScience. 2021 Mar 25;24(4):102223. doi: 10.1016/j.isci.2021.102223. eCollection 2021.
- Processing of tactile information by the hippocampus. Pereira A, Ribeiro S, Wiest M, Moore LC, Pantoja J, Lin SC, Nicolelis MA.Proc Natl Acad Sci U S A. 2007 Nov 13;104(46):18286-91. doi: 10.1073/pnas.0708611104.
- Graph analysis of dream reports is especially informative about psychosis. Mota NB, Furtado R, Maia PP, Copelli M, Ribeiro S.Sci Rep. 2014 Jan 15;4:3691. doi: 10.1038/srep03691.
- Automated analysis of free speech predicts psychosis onset in high-risk youths. Bedi G, Carrillo F, Cecchi GA, Slezak DF, Sigman M, Mota NB, Ribeiro S, Javitt DC, Copelli M, Corcoran CM.npj Schizophr. 2015 Aug 26;1:15030. doi: 10.1038/npjschz.2015.30.
- Hippocampus-retrosplenial cortex interaction is increased during phasic REM and contributes to memory consolidation. de Almeida-Filho DG, Koike BDV, Billwiller F, Farias KS, de Sales IRP, Luppi PH, Ribeiro S, Queiroz CM.Sci Rep. 2021 Jun 22;11(1):13078. doi: 10.1038/s41598-021-91659-5.
- The interpretation of dream meaning: Resolving ambiguity using Latent Semantic Analysis in a small corpus of text. Altszyler E, Ribeiro S, Sigman M, Fernández Slezak D.Conscious Cogn. 2017 Nov;56:178-187. doi: 10.1016/j.concog.2017.09.004.
- Spike avalanches exhibit universal dynamics across the sleep-wake cycle. Ribeiro TL, Copelli M, Caixeta F, Belchior H, Chialvo DR, Nicolelis MA, Ribeiro S.PLoS One. 2010 Nov 30;5(11):e14129. doi: 10.1371/journal.pone.0014129.
- Thought disorder measured as random speech structure classifies negative symptoms and schizophrenia diagnosis 6 months in advance. Mota NB, Copelli M, Ribeiro S.npj Schizophr. 2017 Apr 13;3:18. doi: 10.1038/s41537-017-0019-3.
- LSD, madness and healing: Mystical experiences as possible link between psychosis model and therapy model. Wießner I, Falchi M, Palhano-Fontes F, Feilding A, Ribeiro S, Tófoli LF.Psychol Med. 2021 Jul 13:1-15. doi: 10.1017/S0033291721002531.
- Naps in school can enhance the duration of declarative memories learned by adolescents. Lemos N, Weissheimer J, Ribeiro S.Front Syst Neurosci. 2014 Jun 3;8:103. doi: 10.3389/fnsys.2014.00103.
- Activation of frontal neocortical areas by vocal production in marmosets. Simões CS, Vianney PV, de Moura MM, Freire MA, Mello LE, Sameshima K, Araújo JF, Nicolelis MA, Mello CV, Ribeiro S.Front Integr Neurosci. 2010 Sep 23;4:123. doi: 10.3389/fnint.2010.00123.
- Speech graphs provide a quantitative measure of thought disorder in psychosis. Mota NB, Vasconcelos NA, Lemos N, Pieretti AC, Kinouchi O, Cecchi GA, Copelli M, Ribeiro S.PLoS One. 2012;7(4):e34928. doi: 10.1371/journal.pone.0034928.
- The psychedelic state induced by ayahuasca modulates the activity and connectivity of the default mode network. Palhano-Fontes F, Andrade KC, Tofoli LF, Santos AC, Crippa JA, Hallak JE, Ribeiro S, de Araujo DB.PLoS One. 2015 Feb 18;10(2):e0118143. doi: 10.1371/journal.pone.0118143.
- Long-term use of psychedelic drugs is associated with differences in brain structure and personality in humans. Bouso JC, Palhano-Fontes F, Rodríguez-Fornells A, Ribeiro S, Sanches R, Crippa JA, Hallak JE, de Araujo DB, Riba J.Eur Neuropsychopharmacol. 2015 Apr;25(4):483-92. doi: 10.1016/j.euroneuro.2015.01.008.
- Seeing with the eyes shut: neural basis of enhanced imagery following Ayahuasca ingestion. de Araujo DB, Ribeiro S, Cecchi GA, Carvalho FM, Sanchez TA, Pinto JP, de Martinis BS, Crippa JA, Hallak JE, Santos AC.Hum Brain Mapp. 2012 Nov;33(11):2550-60. doi: 10.1002/hbm.21381.
- Electrophysiological Evidence That the Retrosplenial Cortex Displays a Strong and Specific Activation Phased with Hippocampal Theta during Paradoxical (REM) Sleep. Koike BDV, Farias KS, Billwiller F, Almeida-Filho D, Libourel PA, Tiran-Cappello A, Parmentier R, Blanco W, Ribeiro S, Luppi PH, Queiroz CM.J Neurosci. 2017 Aug 16;37(33):8003-8013. doi: 10.1523/JNEUROSCI.0026-17.2017.
- Cross-modal responses in the primary visual cortex encode complex objects and correlate with tactile discrimination. Vasconcelos N, Pantoja J, Belchior H, Caixeta FV, Faber J, Freire MA, Cota VR, Anibal de Macedo E, Laplagne DA, Gomes HM, Ribeiro S.Proc Natl Acad Sci U S A. 2011 Sep 13;108(37):15408-13. doi: 10.1073/pnas.1102780108.
- Novel experience induces persistent sleep-dependent plasticity in the cortex but not in the hippocampus. Ribeiro S, Shi X, Engelhard M, Zhou Y, Zhang H, Gervasoni D, Lin SC, Wada K, Lemos NA, Nicolelis MA.Front Neurosci. 2007 Oct 15;1(1):43-55. doi: 10.3389/neuro.01.1.1.003.2007.
- Global forebrain dynamics predict rat behavioral states and their transitions. Gervasoni D, Lin SC, Ribeiro S, Soares ES, Pantoja J, Nicolelis MA.J Neurosci. 2004 Dec 8;24(49):11137-47. doi: 10.1523/JNEUROSCI.3524-04.2004.
- Symbols are not uniquely human. Ribeiro S, Loula A, de Araújo I, Gudwin R, Queiroz J.Biosystems. 2007 Jul-Aug;90(1):263-72. doi: 10.1016/j.biosystems.2006.09.030.
- Selective Inhibition of Mirror Invariance for Letters Consolidated by Sleep Doubles Reading Fluency. Torres AR, Mota NB, Adamy N, Naschold A, Lima TZ, Copelli M, Weissheimer J, Pegado F, Ribeiro S.Curr Biol. 2021 Feb 22;31(4):909. doi: 10.1016/j.cub.2021.01.082.
- Graph analysis of verbal fluency test discriminate between patients with Alzheimer's disease, mild cognitive impairment and normal elderly controls. Bertola L, Mota NB, Copelli M, Rivero T, Diniz BS, Romano-Silva MA, Ribeiro S, Malloy-Diniz LF.Front Aging Neurosci. 2014 Jul 29;6:185. doi: 10.3389/fnagi.2014.00185.
- Neuronal activity in the primary somatosensory thalamocortical loop is modulated by reward contingency during tactile discrimination. Pantoja J, Ribeiro S, Wiest M, Soares E, Gervasoni D, Lemos NA, Nicolelis MA.J Neurosci. 2007 Sep 26;27(39):10608-20. doi: 10.1523/JNEUROSCI.5279-06.2007.
- Long-lasting novelty-induced neuronal reverberation during slow-wave sleep in multiple forebrain areas. Ribeiro S, Gervasoni D, Soares ES, Zhou Y, Lin SC, Pantoja J, Lavine M, Nicolelis MA.PLoS Biol. 2004 Jan;2(1):E24. doi: 10.1371/journal.pbio.0020024. Epub 2004 Jan 20.
- Induction of hippocampal long-term potentiation during waking leads to increased extrahippocampal zif-268 expression during ensuing rapid-eye-movement sleep. Ribeiro S, Mello CV, Velho T, Gardner TJ, Jarvis ED, Pavlides C.J Neurosci. 2002 Dec 15;22(24):10914-23. doi: 10.1523/JNEUROSCI.22-24-10914.2002.

=== Nonfiction - science communication ===
- Maconha, Cérebro e Saúde in co-authorship with Renato Malcher-Lopes (Editora Vieira e Lent, 2007; Yagé, 2019).
- Limiar, articles published monthly since 2004 in the Brazilian magazine Mente e Cérebro (Editora Duetto, 2015; Companhia das Letras, 2020).
- The Oracle of Night – The History and Science of Dreams (Pantheon Books, 2021)

=== Fiction ===
- Entendendo as Coisas, collection of short stories including the winner of the Guimarães Rosa Prize 1996 by Radio France Internationale (Puslisher L&PM, 1998).
