= John Chapin =

John Chapin may refer to:

- John B. Chapin (1829–1918), American physician and mental hospital administrator
- John L. Chapin (1913–1944), United States Army captain
- John Putnam Chapin (1810–1864), mayor of Chicago, Illinois
- John R. Chapin (1827–1907), American artist and illustrator

== See also ==
- Captain John L. Chapin High School, El Paso, Texas, United States
