= Brain–brain interface =

Direct communication between animal brains

A brain–brain interface is a direct communication pathway between the brain of one animal and the brain of another animal.

Brain to brain interfaces have been used to help rats collaborate with each other. When a second rat was unable to choose the correct lever, the first rat noticed (not getting a second reward), and produced a round of task-related neuron firing that made the second rat more likely to choose the correct lever.

In 2013, Rajesh Rao was able to use electrical brain recordings and a form of magnetic stimulation to send a brain signal to Andrea Stocco on the other side of the University of Washington campus. In 2015, researchers linked up the brains of multiple monkeys in one experiment and rats in another to form an "organic computer".

It is hypothesized that by using brain-to-brain interfaces (BTBIs) a biological computer, or brain-net, could be constructed using animal brains as its computational units. Initial exploratory work demonstrated collaboration between rats in distant cages linked by signals from cortical microelectrode arrays implanted in their brains. The rats were rewarded when actions were performed by the "decoding rat" which conformed to incoming signals and when signals were transmitted by the "encoding rat" which resulted in the desired action. In the initial experiment the rewarded action was pushing a lever in the remote location corresponding to the position of a lever near a lighted LED at the home location. About a month was required for the rats to acclimate themselves to incoming "brainwaves."

Lastly, it is important to stress that the topology of BTBI does not need to be restricted to one encoder and one decoder subjects. Instead, we have already proposed that, in theory, channel accuracy can be increased if instead of a dyad a whole grid of multiple reciprocally interconnected brains are employed. Such a computing structure could define the first example of an organic computer capable of solving heuristic problems that would be deemed non-computable by a general Turing-machine. Future works will elucidate in detail the characteristics of this multi-brain system, its computational capabilities, and how it compares to other non-Turing computational architectures

Miguel Nicolelis of Duke University, one of the investigators who did the experiment with rats, has done previous work using a brain–computer interface.

The applicability of this method has been demonstrated in many studies using BBI, but the mixed environment and continuous movement of a mammal make it difficult to construct an effective BBI for multigrade control. Therefore, the BBI system must provide a timely response, a high level of accuracy in terms of immediate decoding and retrieval of information, and real-time visual feedback of the ongoing rat movement. The 2018 study, by Zhang and colleagues, describes wireless brain-brain interfaces that allow humans to mentally control the continuous movements of living rats. The study showed that rat cyborgs can be seamlessly and successfully guided by the human mind to complete a navigation task in a complex maze. And with this experiment, it has been demonstrated that computer-assisted BBI can enable collaboration between two brains through multidimensional information transfer and lead to future studies.
