= Cliff Tucker =

American basketball player (1989–2018)

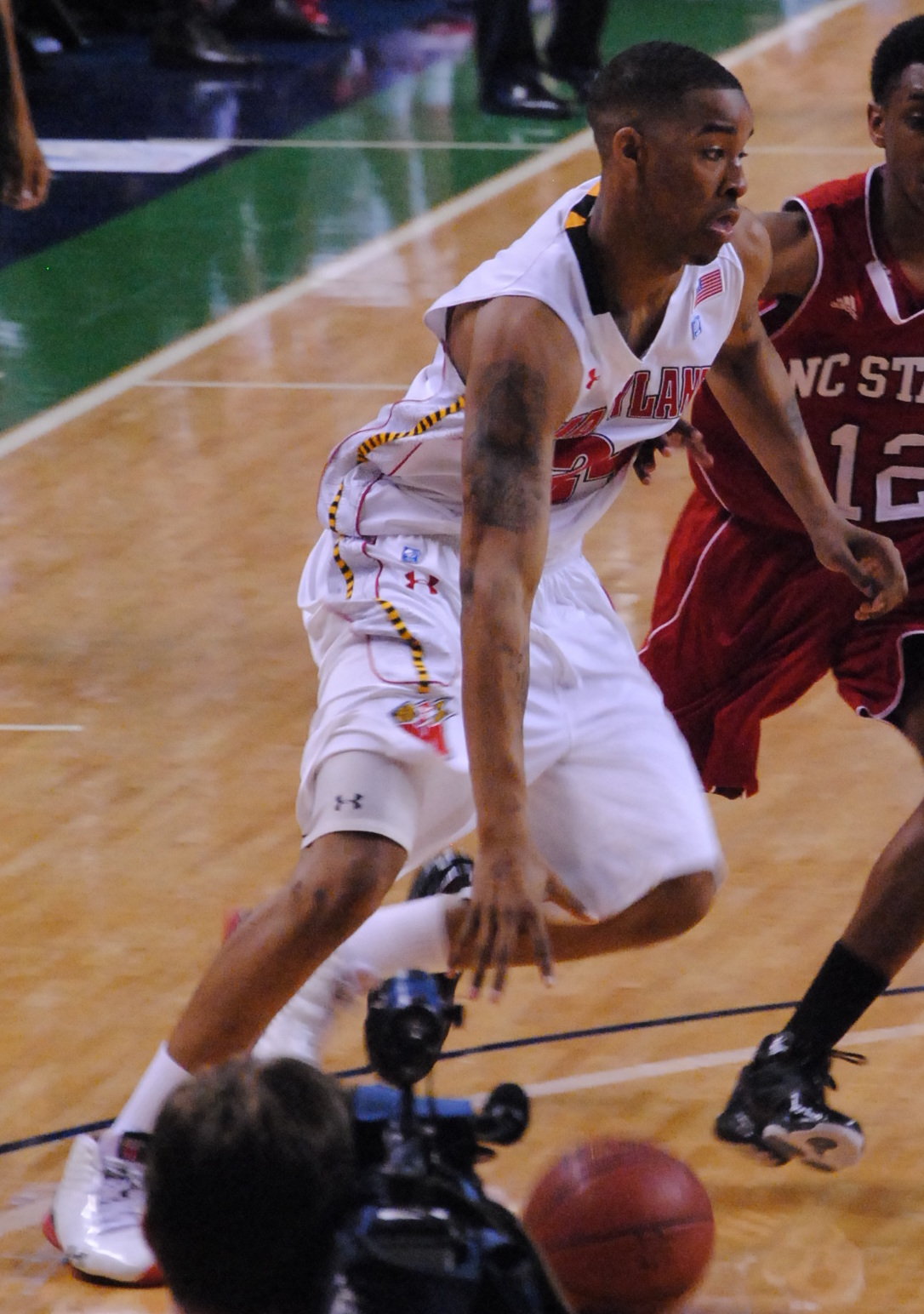
- Tucker playing for Maryland in 2011

Personal information
- Born: January 12, 1989 El Paso, Texas, U.S.
- Died: May 28, 2018 (aged 29) Balmorhea, Texas, U.S.
- Listed height: 6 ft 6 in (1.98 m)
- Listed weight: 215 lb (98 kg)

Career information
- High school: Chapin (El Paso, Texas)
- College: Maryland (2007–2011)
- NBA draft: 2011: undrafted
- Playing career: 2012–2018
- Position: Shooting guard

Career history
- 2012–2013: Springfield Armor
- 2013–2014: Indios UACJ
- 2013–2015: Huracanes de Tampico
- 2014: Toros de Aragua
- 2014: Indios de San Francisco de Macorís
- 2015: Academia de la Montana
- 2015: Soproni KC
- 2015–2016: Nürnberg Falcons BC
- 2016: Club San Sebastian
- 2016–2017: Lobos UAD Mazatlán
- 2017–2018: Asociación Deportiva Atenas

Cliff Tucker (January 12, 1989 – May 28, 2018) was an American professional basketball player. He competed with Maryland at the collegiate level. He was killed in a traffic accident on May 28, 2018.

== High school career ==
Tucker attended Chapin High School in El Paso, Texas and starred on the basketball court and football field. He averaged 21.4 points and 10.1 rebounds per game as a senior and received 939 yards and had 19 touchdown catches in football. Tucker received interest from his hometown school UTEP, Texas, Oregon, Maryland and Washington State. The star player would eventually sign and attend Maryland. He was an All-City MVP in 2007 and was a two-time All-Region and All-State selection.

== College career ==
When Tucker was recruited to Maryland he was told he could play both basketball and football. He played four seasons for the Terrapins from 2007 to 2011 and participated in 131 games. As a junior, he hit a buzzer-beating three-pointer to defeat Georgia Tech in overtime, shooting from over 25 feet on a pass from Eric Hayes. The shot came after star player Greivis Vásquez hit a three-pointer that was waved off when a referee heard a coach call a timeout. Thanks to the victory, the Terrapins remained in contention for the Atlantic Coast Conference title, which they shared with Duke. As a junior, he averaged 5.7 points per game off the bench and helped Maryland to its second straight NCAA Tournament berth. Tucker averaged 9.6 points and 3.5 rebounds per game as a senior in 2010–2011.

Tucker joined the Maryland football team for spring practice in 2011. He transferred to UTEP, where he joined the football team for a season.

== Professional career ==
After his college career, Tucker joined the Springfield Armor of the NBA D-League in 2012 and averaged 6.5 points and 3.5 rebounds per game in 13 contests. Tucker played overseas basketball for several years and split time in Hungary, Germany and the Dominican Republic in 2015. He competed for Nürnberg Falcons BC of the German ProA and played 14 games averaging 5.9 points and 2.1 rebounds per game. He also played in Venezuela and Columbia. In the 2016–17 season, Tucker played 32 games for Lobos UAD Mazatlán of the Mexican CIBACOPA and averaged 20.5 points, 5.2 rebounds, and 3.5 assists per game. In his final professional season in 2017–18, he averaged 2.3 points per game on the Argentinian club Asociación Deportiva Atenas and appeared in four games.

== Death ==
On May 28, 2018, while travelling from San Antonio to El Paso, Tucker was killed in a car accident on Interstate 10 about three miles west of Balmorhea, Texas. The tread on the right rear tire of the Ford Transit van he was riding in separated, which caused the vehicle to lose control and roll. Tucker was not wearing a seat belt and was one of three passengers killed immediately. The weather conditions were clear and the road was dry. Only the driver, Joseph Kennerly III, and another passenger, Marcus R. Lovelace, were wearing seatbelts. His wife, Genesis Soto, and daughter, Andrea Soto, were also injured. "Cliff was a great teammate willing to do whatever it took to make us champions," said former Maryland basketball coach Gary Williams.
