= 2014 FIFA World Cup opening ceremony =

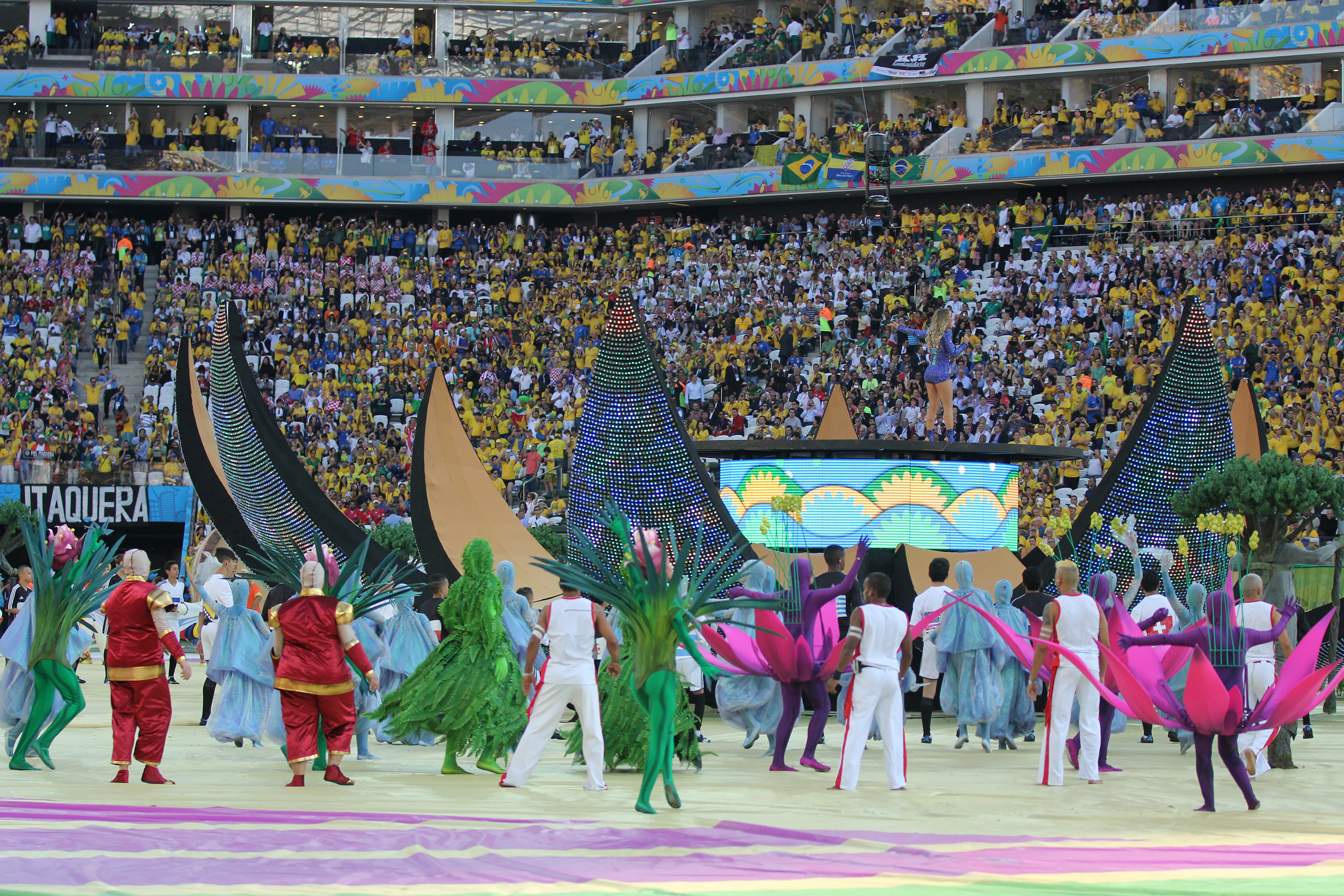
- Performers surrounding the "living ball" as it opened with native singer Claudia Leitte on stage.
- Date: 12 June 2014
- Time: 15:15 Brasília official time (UTC-3)
- Location: Arena de São Paulo, São Paulo, Brazil

The 2014 FIFA World Cup opening ceremony took place on Thursday, 12 June 2014, at the Arena de São Paulo in São Paulo, Brazil at 15:15 Brasília official time (UTC−3), about a quarter to two hours before the opening match of the tournament between host Brazil and Croatia.

== Before the ceremony ==
In the hours leading up to the ceremony, several hundred Brazilian football fans took to the streets to sing and declare their support for the host nation's national team, as excitement for the opening match of the tournament continued to build up. However, several thousand others continued demonstrations against the cost of hosting the tournament, which are estimated at a total of about US$16 billion at the expense of both FIFA and the Brazilian government, making it the most expensive World Cup in history. Police in São Paulo reportedly had to use teargas to disperse one group of around 50 protesters, while striking airport workers blocked off a road leading to the Aeroporto Internacional de São Paulo, demanding an increase in wages as well as a World Cup bonus. The strike was to have lasted for 24 hours, but for legal reasons union leaders called it off early.

== Dignitaries in attendance ==
The opening match and ceremony was attended by many guests :

- Ban Ki-moon, Secretary General of the United Nations
- (Union of South American Nations) Ali Rodriguez Araque, Secretary General of UNASUR
- Sepp Blatter, President of FIFA
- Dilma Rousseff, President of Brazil
- Ivo Josipović, President of Croatia
- Ali Bin Al Hussein, Prince of Jordan
- Albert II, Prince of Monaco
- Ali Bongo Ondimba, President of Gabon
- Michelle Bachelet, President of Chile
- Horacio Cartes, President of Paraguay
- Jose Mujica, President of Uruguay
- Jose Eduardo dos Santos, President of Angola
- Evo Morales, President of Bolivia
- Desi Bouterse, President of Suriname
- Rafael Correa, President of Ecuador

== Performances ==
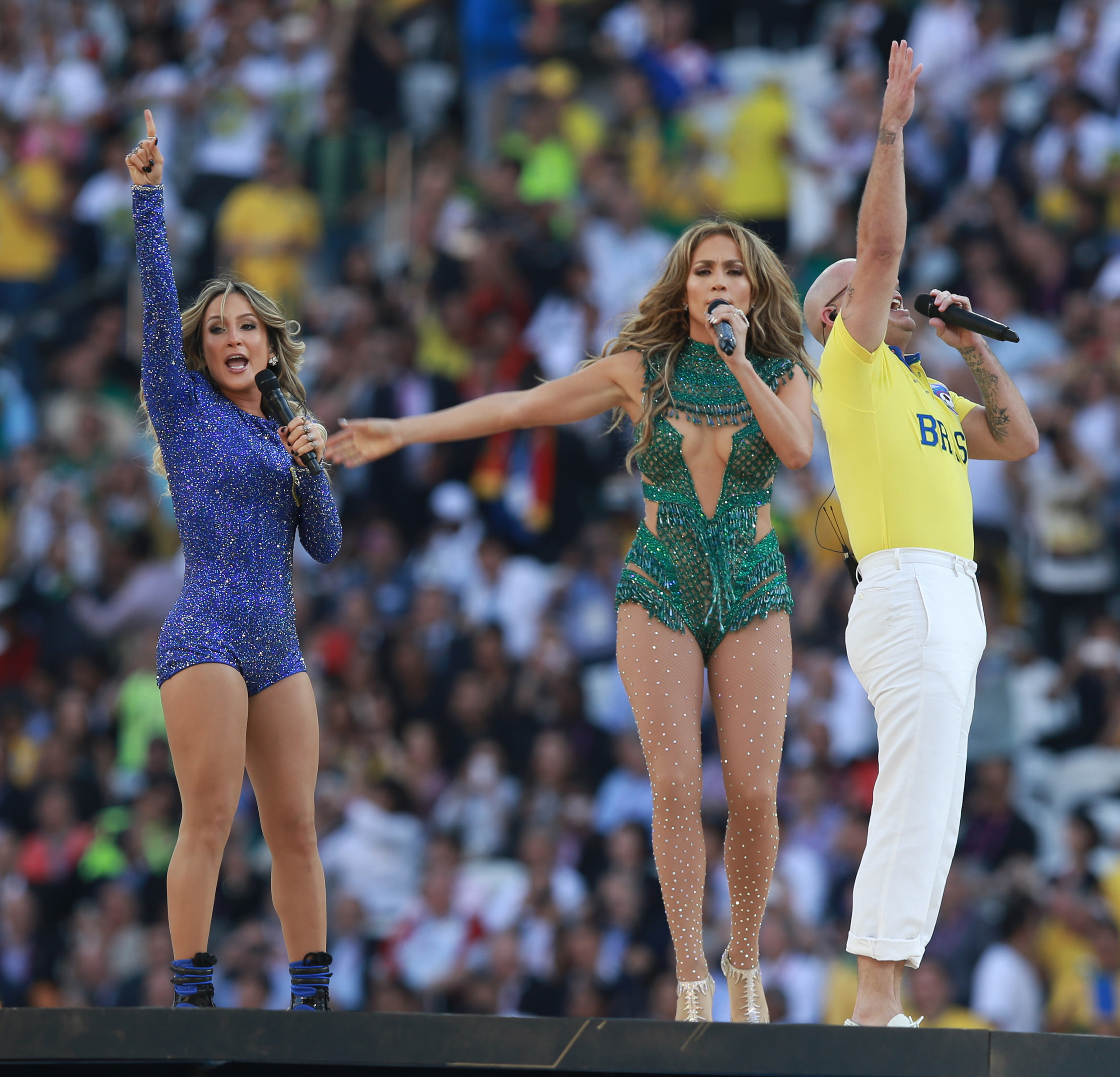
Claudia Leitte, Jennifer Lopez and Pitbull singing at the opening ceremony

With the ceremony lasting about 30 minutes, a host of 660 dancers put on a performance paying tribute to Brazil's nature, people and football, with a "living ball" situated in the middle of the pitch. The performers were dressed as several types of trees and flowers. The entire ensemble performed three separate acts leading up to the finale where the ball opened up to reveal Brazilian singer Claudia Leitte, who sang alone for a few minutes before being joined by Jennifer Lopez and Pitbull, with whom she performed the tournament's official song "We Are One (Ole Ola)", which was co-written and recorded by the three artists. The cost of the opening ceremony is estimated at R$18 million.

The ceremonial first kick was delivered by Juliano Pinto, a paraplegic using a robotic suit from the Walk Again Project.
