= Captain John L. Chapin High School =

High school in El Paso, Texas

Coordinates: 31.8427°N 106.4426°W

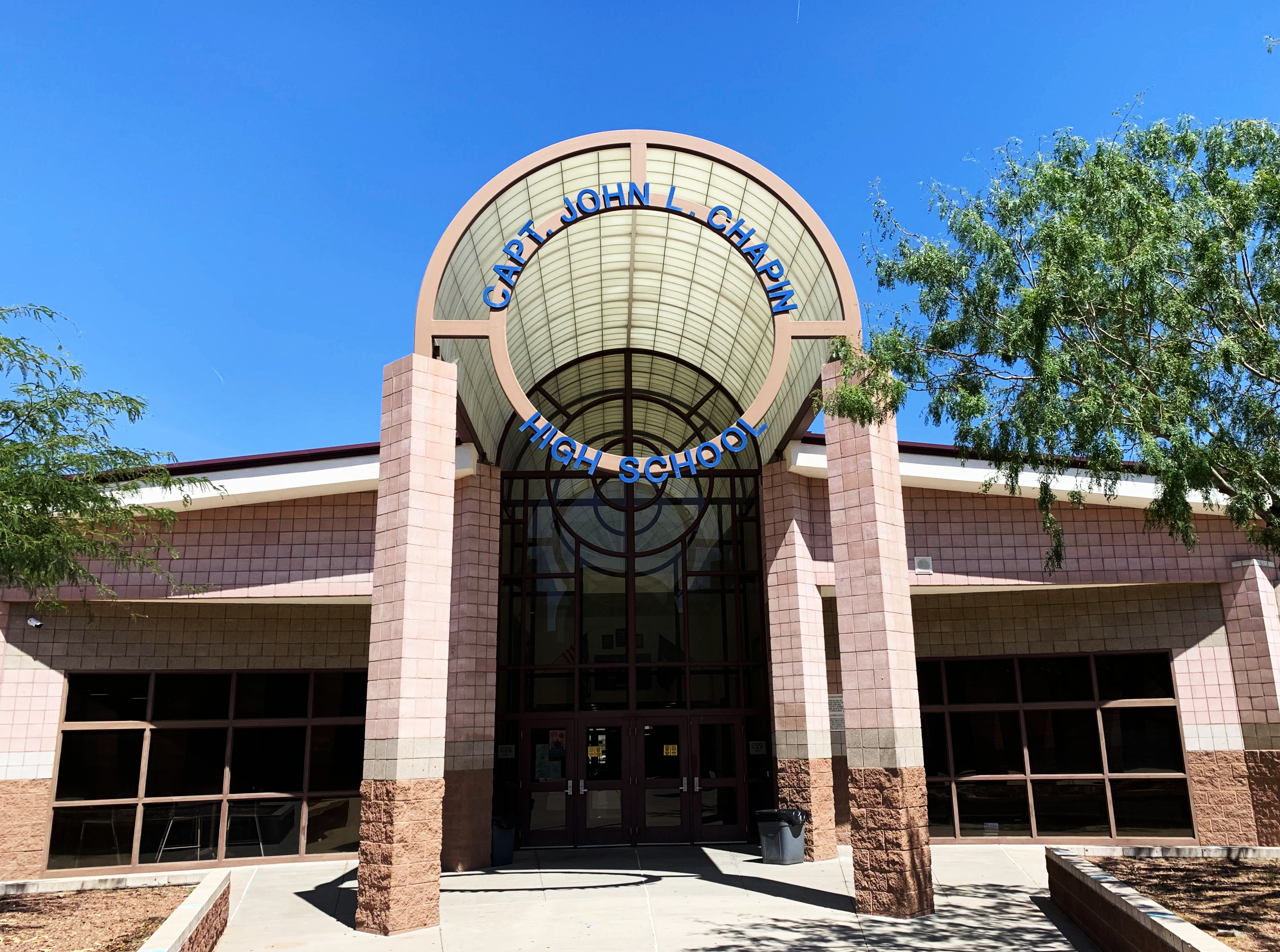
- 7000 Dyer Street; El Paso, Texas 79904

Information
- Type: Public
- Motto: Home of the Huskies
- Established: Fall 1999
- Principal: Ragen Chappell
- Staff: 102.5 (FTE)
- Enrollment: 1,812 (2023-2024)
- Student to teacher ratio: 17.7
- Campus: Suburban
- Colors: Navy blue, white and Columbia blue
- Athletics conference: 1-5A
- Nickname: Huskies
- Website: www.episd.org/o/chs

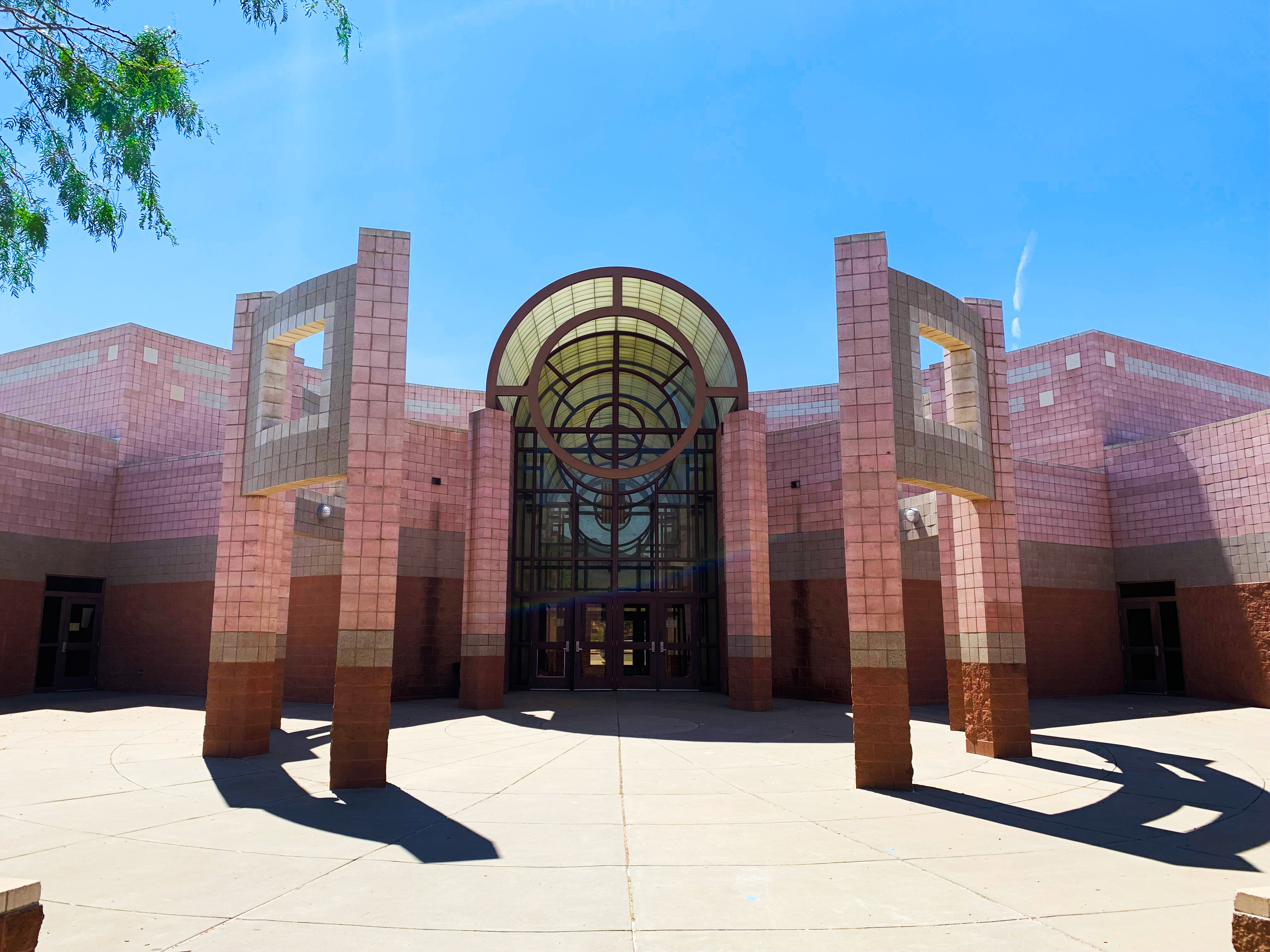
Chapin's fine arts building

Chapin High School is a public high school in El Paso, Texas. Chapin is located at the intersection of Dyer Street and Ellerthorpe Avenue. This land is reserved for the United States Government and is a part of the El Paso Independent School District. It is the only high school in the continental United States that is on government property but not owned by the government. The school enrolls over 1,800 students in grades 9 to 12. Nearly half of the students are military dependents from nearby Fort Bliss. The school also accepts students from throughout the city of El Paso as part of its pre-engineering magnet program.

This is a locator map showing El Paso County in Texas.

== Catchment area ==
Much of Fort Bliss is zoned to Chapin, including the western half of the main post, the Logan area around Ellerthorpe Avenue in which the Chapin campus is located and the residential areas around William Beaumont Army Medical Center. The eastern and southern portions of the main post and Biggs Army Airfield are zoned to Austin High. The Chapin attendance zone also includes several inner Central El Paso neighborhoods immediately northeast and southeast of William Beaumont Army Medical Center. These include the Upper Copia neighborhood (also known as Lower Dyer) along Dyer Street from Pierce Avenue north to Hayes Avenue to the southeast of the hospital; adjacent military housing areas between Hayes Avenue and Fred Wilson Boulevard; and the Skyline Acres West, Park Foothills and Mountain Park neighborhoods lying on the eastern slopes of the Franklin Mountains and along the western ends of Hercules, Hondo Pass and Titanic Avenues to the north of the Chapin campus. Chapin's feeder middle schools include Bassett Middle and Canyon Hills Middle. The Fort Bliss residential areas zoned to Chapin for the high-school grades are zoned to Bassett Middle for the middle-school grades. Elementary schools in the Chapin feeder pattern include Bliss, Burnet, Logan, Park, Powell and Travis. Bliss, Logan, and Powell are located on the base and Travis, while located just off post in the Lower Dyer neighborhood, largely serves the residential areas around William Beaumont Army Medical Center.

== Growth and expansion ==
With the growth of Fort Bliss and the troop influx, Chapin High School has experienced a large increase in student enrollment. Overcrowding and lack of additional classrooms was addressed in the 2007 EPISD Bond Program in which the addition 12 classrooms was approved to alleviate overcrowding. Chapin currently has 17 portable classrooms, numerous "floating" teachers and a need for additional science laboratories. Once the new addition that was started in February 2010 is complete, the issue will be addressed. The new addition is located by the gymnasium entrance and tennis courts and it is expected to be two stories tall with the capability of being expanded in later years.

== History of Capt. John L. Chapin ==
Chapin High was named after a local World War II hero, Captain John L. Chapin. Before enlisting in the National Guard, Chapin graduated from Texas A&M University with a degree in chemical engineering. He intended to go to medical school after graduating but postponed his plans so that he could join the National Guard.

In November 1940, Chapin's unit was activated as Company E, 141st Infantry, 36th Division of the United States Army. In 1942, the unit was sent overseas to North Africa. Chapin declined several promotions in order to stay with Company E as the unit consisted mostly of fellow El Pasoans. Most Company E men were Hispanic and non-English speakers. Chapin thought that, if he took the promotion, Company E would probably be left to a non-Spanish speaking commander who would mistreat the soldiers. For this reason, his men respected him. Chapin was killed leading the men of Company E into the Battle of Rapido River in Italy.

== Chapin pre-engineering magnet program ==
Chapin Magnet offers a specific set of classes that specialize in engineering based on the Project Lead the Way curricula. There are five engineering courses offered at Chapin and only those who meet requirements and enroll before high school can attend them. This specialized school allows students from all over El Paso to attend Chapin and take these courses, hence the term "magnet". Students are required to take advanced mathematics and science courses, as well as the five engineering classes. On completion of each course, students may pay a fee to receive credits towards college. At graduation, all engineering students who have passed all five classes receive engineering honors and special cords to wear.

== Academics ==
Chapin has consistently met and maintained state and national testing standards and is one of the few high schools to not be in the Priority Schools Division of EPISD. It offers several Advanced Placement (AP) and Dual Credit courses and it is also one of three schools in the EPISD to offer statewide dual credit courses through the Texas Virtual School Network (TxVSN). Beginning with the 2009–2010 school year, Chapin began offering AP art history and music theory through the distance learning classroom to other district high schools.

Chapin offers AP courses in: English language and composition, English literature and composition, world history, US history, US government, macroeconomics, psychology, physics, biology, chemistry, environmental science, computer science, art history, studio art, music theory, statistics and calculus.

Dual credit classes are offered through EPISD's partnership with the El Paso Community College (EPCC) in English IV, geology, chemistry and US history. Students are eligible to participate in the EPCC dual credit program if they meet all EPCC requirements and pass the subject area ACCUPLACER test for the course they wish to take.

Dual credit US government and psychology are offered through the TxVSN.

== Chapin American football ==
The Chapin football team competes in the Texas 1 – 4A District. The first varsity team for the school began in 2002. In that first season, the team finished with 6 wins and 4 losses and missed the playoffs. From its second year up to the present time, the Chapin football program has had an outstanding record gaining a perfect 10-0 in 2003 and again in 2006. The team has not missed the playoffs since that first season. From 2002 through 2008, it had an 81.4% regular season win percentage (57 wins, 13 losses), an 86% District record (43 wins, 7 losses) and a 45.4% playoff record (5 wins, 6 losses). Overall, the Chapin Huskies have a 76.5% winning percentage (62–19) including playoffs. Daren Walker was the head football coach for Chapin for five seasons from 2002 to 2006 and guided the team to a 47–12 record including the playoffs. Walker left after the 2006 season and took over at Franklin High School in El Paso. Rene Hernandez, QB coach under Walker, took over the team in 2007 and in two seasons guided the team to a 15–6 record including playoffs.

== Notable alumni ==
- Evonne Britton, hurdler
- Cliff Tucker, professional basketball player
