= John L. Chapin =

United States Army captain

- Born: March 15, 1913; El Paso, Texas, U.S.
- Died: January 22, 1944 (aged 30); Gari River, Italy
- Burial place: Sicily–Rome American Cemetery and Memorial, Nettuno, Italy
- Education: Texas A&M University
- Military career
- Allegiance: United States
- Branch: United States Army
- Rank: Captain
- Commands: Company E, 141st Infantry Regiment, 36th Division
- Conflicts: World War II; Battle of Rapido River
- Awards: Silver Star

John Letcher Chapin (March 15, 1913 – January 22, 1944) was an American soldier who served as a captain in the United States Army during World War II. He was born and raised in El Paso, Texas. He earned a degree in chemical engineering from Texas A&M University, worked at the El Paso Post Office, and was soon recruited by a Texas Army National Guard unit.

Chapin became the commander of a company during World War II and declined multiple promotions to remain with his men. He was injured in the Battle of San Pietro Infine but refused to return home, dying in the Battle of Rapido River while trying to break through the Winter Line in Italy on January 22, 1944. He is buried in Italy and memorialized in Captain John L. Chapin High School in El Paso.

== Early and personal life ==
John Letcher Chapin was born on March 15, 1913, in El Paso, Texas. He attended grade school and high school in the El Paso Independent School District and Ysleta ISD, graduating from Ysleta High School. Chapin earned his degree in chemical engineering at Texas A&M University in 1936.

At the age of nine years, Chapin met Velma Perkins, whom he married on April 21, 1937. They had a son named Paul on December 27, 1938. Chapin worked at the El Paso Post Office and planned to attend medical school prior to joining the military.

== Military career ==
A Texas Army National Guard unit approached Chapin about becoming their chemical warfare officer with his degree, and he chose to join the Infantry Branch instead. He only planned to stay in the unit for a year, but his company was activated in November 1940 as Company E, 141st Infantry Regiment, 36th Division.

While in training, Chapin was promoted and assumed control of the company. He was respected by its members due to his skill and fairness. However, Chapin declined five promotions to the rank of major to stay with his company. Most of his company members were Hispanic and non-English speakers, and Chapin, who spoke Spanish fluently, believed leaving his company could bring a non-Spanish-speaking captain who would mistreat the soldiers. Another particular example of Chapin's perceived devotion to his soldiers is his unit's boycott of a burger restaurant in El Paso. The restaurant's business manager displayed a sign refusing service to Black and Mexican people, which led to a boycott from the entire unit and a US$500 fine for discrimination.

Company E was stationed at various locations across the United States, while Chapin's family eventually chose to settle in California.

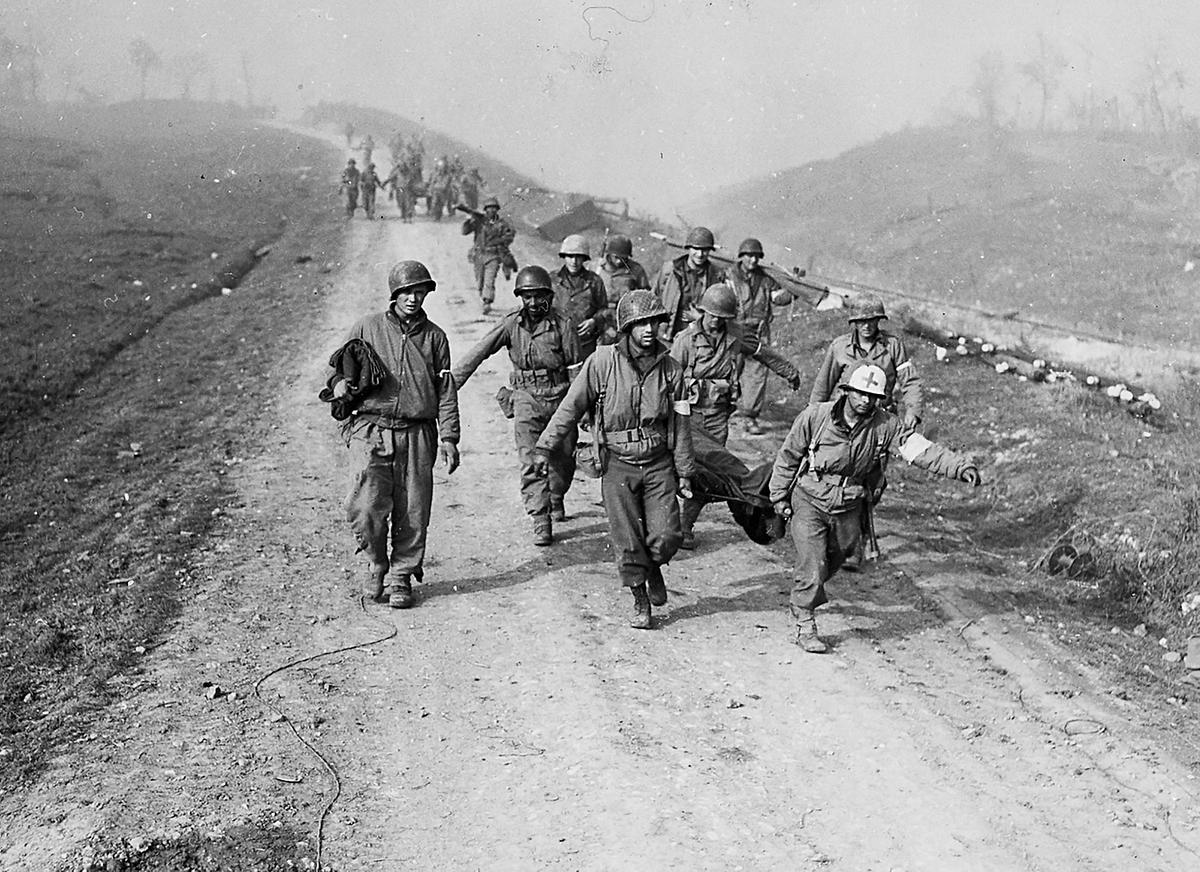
American soldiers bringing back the wounded after the Battle of Rapido River

On December 12, 1942, Chapin departed on a train to the front line in Europe during World War II. He fought at Salerno and San Pietro Infine, where he was severely injured and refused to return home in order to stay with his company. He was killed by German machine gun fire on January 22, 1944, while trying to break through the Winter Line in Italy during the Battle of Rapido River, which occurred on the Gari River. His body was found in a foxhole and he was posthumously awarded a Silver Star for his courage and devotion. Only 27 of the 145 present soldiers of Company E survived the battle.

Velma did not learn of Chapin's death until February 22, 1944, exactly a full month after he died. His body is buried at the Sicily–Rome American Cemetery and Memorial in Nettuno, Italy, and his gravestone displays the letters "KIA" to symbolize that he was killed in action defending the United States.

== Legacy ==
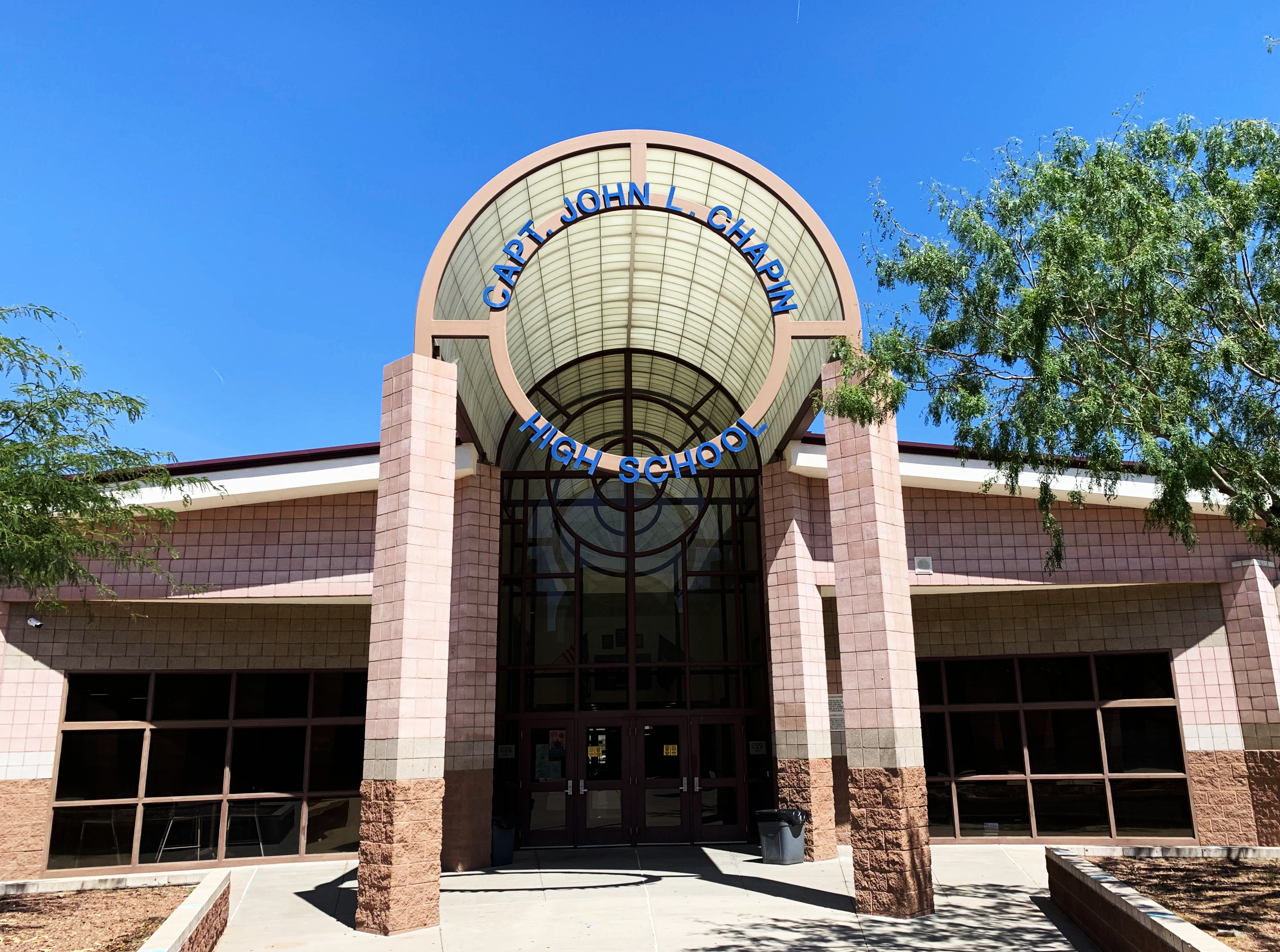
Captain John L. Chapin High School in El Paso, Texas, named after Chapin

His legacy is memorialized in the name of Captain John L. Chapin High School in El Paso, which was dedicated in 2001. The committee to decide the name for the new school initially planned to use the name of a local Hispanic war hero, but spoke with many living members of Company E, who insisted on Chapin's name instead. They cited Chapin's selflessness, refusal to accept promotions, and respect for the people he led.

Company E as a whole is remembered through historical books such as Patriots from the Barrio, which Wilmer Valderrama and WM Entertainment have acquired film and television rights to, and The Men of Company E.
