= International Institute for Neuroscience of Natal =

Brazilian research organization

Coordinates: 5°51′15″S 35°12′51″W

The International Institute for Neurosciences of Natal - Edmond and Lily Safra (IINN-ELS - Portuguese for Instituto Internacional de Neurociências de Natal - Edmond e Lily Safra) is located in Natal, capital city of the Brazilian state of Rio Grande do Norte. It was projected and is directed by neuroscientist Miguel Nicolelis (considered one of the 20 most important neuroscientists in activity in the last decade). The IINN aims to decentralize research in Brazil, currently restricted to South and Southeast regions of Brazil.

There are many educational projects held by the IINN, to support the local community and teach science to children of the nearby area. Nicolelis said he chose that district to create the institute exactly because it was the worst in terms of education.

One of its objectives is to allow the return of Brazilian scientists to the country and create an enabling environment for foreigners to come based on criteria internally defined by the institution's managers. In 2007, the IINN received a cash reinforcement: Education Minister Fernando Haddad signed a decree allocating R $42 million to the institution. In 2007, on the occasion of the II IINN Symposium, it was renamed the Edmond and Lily Safra International Christmas Neuroscience Institute through an agreement with the Safra Foundation.

It was endowed by the Edmond J. Safra Foundation.
