= TCM Underground =

Former TV programming block, showcasing cult films

- Network: Turner Classic Movies
- Launched: October 13, 2006; 20 years ago
- Closed: February 24, 2023; 3 years ago
- Country of origin: United States
- Owner: Warner Bros. Discovery
- Key people: Rob Zombie (former host); Eric Weber (programmer, 2006–2007); Millie De Chirico (programmer, 2007–2023)
- Headquarters: Atlanta, Georgia
- Format: Cult film
- Running time: Around 4 hours

TCM Underground was an American weekly late-night cult film showcase airing on Turner Classic Movies. Developed by former TCM marketing director Eric Weber, it was originally hosted by industrial rock/heavy metal musician and independent filmmaker Rob Zombie. The films were programmed by Eric Weber until 2007, when TCM programmer Millie De Chirico took over the role. The block ended on February 24, 2023, following layoffs in December that included De Chirico.

The series was launched in an attempt to attract more young viewers to Turner's older-skewing audience. TCM began airing a new program titled Friday Night Spotlight and, in effect, TCM Underground was moved from its Friday time slot to Saturdays beginning April 6, 2013 (a TCM broadcast day runs from 6 am – 5:59 am EST the following day, making Underground, in fact, airing on Sunday); however, on March 10, 2018, the series returned to its original Friday night time slot. Promotional bumper material and opening credit sequences were created by Raygun. The series was periodically preempted by special month-long or seasonal scheduling themes, such as February's "31 Days of Oscar" film series and the month-long "Summer Under the Stars". When it did not conflict with a special theme, TCM Underground aired in its usual slot early on Saturday morning.

The cult films featured in TCM Underground belonged to a number of genres, including but not limited to blaxploitation films (Coffy, Darktown Strutters, The Mack), horror, slasher, and giallo films (Let's Scare Jessica to Death, Black Christmas, Hatchet for the Honeymoon), and counterculture films (An American Hippie in Israel, Ciao! Manhattan, Blue Sunshine). On October 13, 2006, Plan 9 from Outer Space was the block's first film broadcast, paired with Bride of the Monster; it was also the block's final film when it closed on February 24, 2023, paired with various drug education short films.

== List of feature films in the TCM Underground block ==
- 13 Frightened Girls (1963)
- 13 Ghosts (1960)
- The 5,000 Fingers of Dr. T. (1953)
- Abar, the First Black Superman (1977)
- ABBA: The Movie (1977)
- Absolute Beginners (1986)
- Across 110th Street (1972)
- After Hours (1985)
- Alex in Wonderland (1970)
- Alice, Sweet Alice (1976)
- Alien from L.A. (1988)
- All About Alice (1972)
- All Night Long (1962)
- ...All the Marbles (1981)
- Alligator (1980)
- Alligator II: The Mutation (1991)
- Alone in the Dark (1982)
- Alphabet City (1984)
- An American Hippie in Israel (1972)
- American Ninja (1985)
- American Pop (1981)
- Anatomy of a Psycho (1961)
- Another Son of Sam (1977)
- The Apple (1980)
- Assault on Precinct 13 (1976)
- Attack of the Crab Monsters (1957)
- The Awful Dr. Orloff (1962)
- Babo 73 (1964)
- The Baby (1973)
- Baby Doll (1956)
- The Bad Seed (1956)
- Barbarella (1968)
- Bayou (1957)
- The Beast Must Die (1974)
- The Beast with Five Fingers (1946)
- Beat Street (1984)
- Belladonna of Sadness (1973, aired on March 5, 2017)
- Below the Belt
- Ben (1972)
- Berserk! (1967)
- The Beyond (1981)
- Beyond the Valley of the Dolls (1970)
- Big Bad Mama (1974)
- The Big Cube (1969)
- The Big Doll House (1971)
- Billy the Kid vs. Dracula (1966)
- Black Belt Jones (1974)
- Black Caesar (1973)
- Black Christmas (1974)
- Black Eye (1974)
- Black Gunn (1972)
- Black Mama White Mama (1973)
- Black Moon (1975)
- Black Samson (1974)
- The Black Sleep (1956)
- Blacula (1972)
- Blast of Silence (1961)
- Blood and Black Lace (1964)
- Blood Feast (1963)
- Blood Freak (1972)
- The Blood on Satan's Claw (1971)
- Bloodmatch (1991)
- Bloody Birthday (1981)
- Blue Sunshine (1977; aired on December 7, 2013)
- Blue Steel (1990)
- Blue Velvet (1986)
- Bobbie Jo and the Outlaw (1976)
- Bone (1972)
- The Boogens (1981)
- Border Radio (1987)
- Born in Flames (1983)
- The Born Losers (1967)
- Boss Nigger (1975)
- Brainstorm (1983)
- Breakin' (1984)
- Breakin' 2: Electric Boogaloo (1984)
- Brewster McCloud (1970)
- Bride of the Monster (1955)
- Bring Me the Head of Alfredo Garcia (1974)
- The Brood (1979)
- Brothers (1977)
- A Bucket of Blood (1959)
- Burn, Witch, Burn (1962)
- Burnt Offerings (1976)
- Bus Riley's Back in Town (1965)
- C.C. and Company (1970)
- Caged (1950)
- Caged Heat (1974)
- The Caller (1987)
- The Candy Snatchers (1973)
- Carnival Magic (1981)
- The Cat o' Nine Tails (1971)
- Cat's Eye (1985)
- Chafed Elbows (1966)
- Chained for Life (1952)
- Cherry 2000 (1988)
- Child Bride (1938)
- Children of the Damned (1964)
- The Chocolate War (1988)
- Chopping Mall (1986)
- Christmas Evil (1980)
- The Church (1989)
- Ciao! Manhattan (1972)
- The City of the Dead (1960)
- Class (1983)
- Class of 1984 (1982)
- Clay Pigeon (1971)
- Cleopatra Jones (1973)
- Cleopatra Jones and the Casino of Gold (1975)
- Coffy (1973)
- College Confidential (1960)
- Coma (1978)
- The Conqueror Worm (1968)
- Cookie (1989)
- Cops and Robbers (1973)
- Corruption (1968)
- Corvette Summer (1978)
- Count Yorga, Vampire (1970)
- Countryman (1982)
- Cover Me Babe (1970)
- Crawlspace (1986)
- Crazed Fruit (1956)
- The Crazies (1973)
- The Crazy World of Julius Vrooder (1974)
- Crumb (1995)
- Curse of the Demon (1957)
- Cyborg (1989)
- Darktown Strutters (1975)
- Daughter of Horror (1955)
- Daughters of Satan (1972)
- Day of the Dead (1985)
- Dead Sleep (1990)
- The Dead Zone (1983)
- Deadly Friend (1986)
- Death by Invitation (1971, aired on December 21, 2013)
- Death Force (1978)
- Death Line (1972)
- Death Race 2000 (1975)
- Death Watch (1980)
- Deathdream (1974)
- Deathsport (1978)
- The Decline of Western Civilization Part II: The Metal Years (1988)
- The Decline of Western Civilization III (1998)
- Deep End (1970)
- Dementia 13 (1963)
- Derek (2008)
- The Devil Rides Out (1968)
- The Devil Within Her (1975)
- The Devil-Doll (1936)
- Die! Die! My Darling! (1965)
- Dirty Mary, Crazy Larry (1974)
- Disco Godfather (1979)
- Doctor Blood's Coffin (1961)
- Dolemite (1975)
- The Doll Squad (1973)
- Dolls (1987)
- Don't Open the Door! (1974)
- Door-to-Door Maniac (1961)
- Dr. Jekyll and Sister Hyde (1971)
- Dracula's Dog (1977)
- Dreamscape (1984)
- Drive, He Said (1971)
- Dudes (1987)
- Dusty and Sweets McGee (1971)
- Earth Girls Are Easy (1988)
- Eating Raoul (1982)
- Electra Glide in Blue (1973)
- Emma Mae
- Enter the Dragon (1973)
- Enter the Ninja (1981)
- Equinox (1970)
- Escape from New York (1981)
- Escort Girl (1941)
- Evil Dead II (1987)
- The Exiles (1961)
- Exorcist II: The Heretic (1977)
- Experiment in Terror (1962)
- Eye of the Devil (1966)
- Eyes of a Stranger (1981)
- Eyes of Laura Mars (1978)
- Fame (1980)
- Fantastic Planet (1973)
- The Fast and the Furious (1955)
- Fast-Walking (1982)
- Faster, Pussycat! Kill! Kill! (1966)
- The Fastest Guitar Alive (1967)
- The Fearless Vampire Killers (1967)
- The Fearmakers (1958)
- Final Exam (1981)
- Five on the Black Hand Side (1973)
- The Flesh Merchant (1956)
- Fleshpot on 42nd Street (1972)
- The Fog (1980)
- Forced Vengeance (1982)
- The Foreigner (2003)
- The Fox (1967)
- Foxes (1980)
- Foxy Brown (1974)
- Frankenstein 1970 (1958)
- Frankenstein Created Woman (1967)
- Freaked (1993)
- Freaks (1932)
- Free Radicals: A History of Experimental Film (2011)
- Friday Foster (1975)
- Fright (1971)
- From Beyond (1986)
- From the Life of the Marionettes (1980)
- The Full Treatment (1960)
- Funeral Parade of Roses (1969)
- Galaxy of Terror (1981)
- Games (1967)
- The Gamma People (1956)
- Ganja and Hess (1973)
- The Garbage Pail Kids Movie (1987)
- Gator (1976)
- Ghoulies (1985)
- The Giant Spider Invasion (1975)
- Girls on the Loose (1958)
- The Glory Stompers (1967)
- God Told Me To (1976)
- Grand Theft Auto (1977)
- Greaser's Palace (1972)
- The Green Slime (1968)
- Grizzly (1976)
- Guru, the Mad Monk (1970)
- Gymkata (1985)
- Hackers (1995)
- The Hand (1981)
- Hard Ticket to Hawaii (1987)
- Hardcore (1979)
- The Harder They Come (1972)
- Hatchet for the Honeymoon (1970)
- The Haunting (1963)
- House (aka Hausu) (1977)
- Häxan (1922)
- He Knows You're Alone (1980)
- Head (1968)
- Heathers (1989)
- Heavenly Bodies (1984)
- Heavy Metal (1981)
- Hell Night (1981)
- Hell Up in Harlem (1973)
- Hell's Angels '69 (1969)
- Hercules (1983)
- Here We Go Round the Mulberry Bush (1968)
- The Hidden (1987)
- Hiding Out (1987)
- High-Ballin' (1978)
- Hit Man (1972)
- The Hitman (1991)
- Homicidal (1961)
- The Honeymoon Killers (1970)
- Hooper (1978)
- Horror Express (1972)
- Hot Rods to Hell (1967)
- The House by the Cemetery (1981)
- The House of Seven Corpses (1973)
- House of Usher (1960)
- House of Women (1962)
- The Howling (1981)
- The Hunger (1983)
- The Hypnotic Eye (1960)
- I Bury the Living (1958)
- I Love You, Alice B. Toklas (1968)
- I Saw What You Did (1965)
- I Was a Teenage Zombie (1987)
- Ice Castles (1978)
- The Ice Pirates (1984)
- I'm Gonna Git You Sucka (1988)
- In Cold Blood (1967)
- The Incredibly Strange Creatures Who Stopped Living and Became Mixed Up Zombies (1963)
- Incubus (1966)
- The Iron Rose (1973)
- Island of Lost Souls (1932)
- It Lives Again (1978)
- It's Alive (1974)
- J.C. (1972)
- Jennifer on My Mind (1971)
- Jesse James Meets Frankenstein's Daughter (1966)
- Jigoku (1960)
- Jubilee (1978)
- The Kids Are Alright (1979)
- Killer Klowns from Outer Space (1988)
- Kitten with a Whip (1964)
- Killer Party (1986)
- Kiss of the Tarantula (1975)
- Krull (1983)
- Ladies and Gentlemen, The Fabulous Stains (1982)
- Lady Snowblood (1973)
- Lady Snowblood: Love Song of Vengeance (1974)
- Lady Street Fighter (1980)
- Land of Doom (1986)
- The Last Dragon (1985)
- The Last Man on Earth (1964)
- The Lawnmower Man (1992)
- The Legend of Billie Jean (1985)
- The Legend of Hell House (1973)
- The Legend of Lylah Clare (1968)
- Lemora (1973)
- Let's Kill Uncle (1966)
- Let's Scare Jessica to Death (1973)
- Lifeforce (1985)
- Little Darlings (1980)
- The Little Girl Who Lives Down the Lane (1976)
- Logan's Run (1976)
- Lolita (1962)
- Look in Any Window (1961)
- Love Affair, or the Case of the Missing Switchboard Operator (1967)
- The Loveless (1982)
- Lunatics: A Love Story (1991)
- Lust in the Dust (1985)
- Mac and Me (1988)
- Macabre (1958)
- Machine Gun McCain (1969)
- The Mack (1973)
- Macon County Line (1974)
- Made in U.S.A. (1987)
- Madhouse (1974)
- Magic (1978)
- Making Mr. Right (1987)
- Man Is Not a Bird (1965)
- Maniac (1963)
- The Manitou (1978)
- Marihuana (1936)
- Mark of the Vampire (1935)
- Mary Jane's Not a Virgin Anymore (1996)
- Massacre Mafia Style (1974)
- Maximum Overdrive (1986)
- Melinda (1972)
- Miami Connection (1987)
- Mixed Blood (1984)
- Model Shop (1969)
- Modern Girls (1985)
- Monster a Go-Go (1965)
- Motel Hell (1980)
- Mudhoney (1965)
- The Mummy (1959)
- The Mummy's Shroud (1965)
- The Mutations (1965)
- The Muthers (1976)
- Myra Breckinridge (1970)
- Mystery Train (1989)
- Near Dark (1987)
- The New Gladiators (1984)
- New Year's Evil (1980)
- New York Ninja (2021)
- Night of the Creeps (1986)
- Night of the Lepus (1972)
- Night of the Living Dead (1968)
- The Night of the Strangler (1972)
- Night School (1981)
- Night Train to Terror (1985)
- The Night Visitor (1971)
- Night Warning (1981)
- Night Watch (1973)
- Nightmare Honeymoon (1974)
- A Nightmare on Elm Street 2: Freddy's Revenge (1985)
- Ninja III: The Domination (1984)
- The Ninth Configuration (1980)
- Nothing Lasts Forever (1984)
- Of Unknown Origin (1983)
- The Oracle (1985)
- Orca (1977)
- Out of Bounds (1986)
- Outlaw Blues (1977)
- Over the Edge (1979)
- The Pace That Kills (1935)
- The Pack (1977)
- The Panic in Needle Park (1972)
- Pat Garrett and Billy the Kid (1973)
- Penitentiary (1979)
- Performance (1970)
- Phantom of the Rue Morgue (1954)
- Phase IV (1974)
- Pipe Dreams (1976)
- Piranha (1978)
- Plan 9 from Outer Space (1959)
- Poltergeist (1982)
- Polyester (1981)
- Poor Pretty Eddie (1975)
- Portrait of Jason (1967)
- Possession (1981)
- Prehistoric Women (1967)
- Pretty Poison (1968)
- The Private Files of J. Edgar Hoover (1977)
- Private Parts (1972)
- Private Property (1960)
- Psycho (1960)
- Psych-Out (1968)
- Psychomania (1973)
- The Psychopath (1966)
- Punk Vacation (1990)
- Puppet Master (1989)
- Putney Swope (1969)
- The Pyramid (1976))
- The Queen (1968)
- Queen of Blood (1966)
- Queen of Outer Space (1958)
- Rabid (1977)
- Race with the Devil (1975)
- Rad (1986)
- Rafferty and the Gold Dust Twins (1975)
- Rappin' (1985)
- Rat Pfink a Boo Boo (1965)
- Rattlers
- Razorback (1984)
- The Rebel Rousers (1970)
- Red Sonja (1985)
- Reefer Madness (1936)
- Remember My Name (1978)
- Repo Man (1984)
- Repulsion (1965)
- Return of the Street Fighter (1974)
- Return to Macon County (1974)
- Revenge of the Ninja (1983)
- Rich Kids (1979)
- Riki-Oh: The Story of Ricky (1991)
- River's Edge (1987)
- Roadgames (1981)
- The Road to Ruin (1934)
- RoboCop (1987)
- RoboCop 2 (1990)
- The Robot vs. The Aztec Mummy (1957)
- Rock 'n' Roll High School (1979)
- Roller Boogie (1979)
- S.F.W. (1994)
- The Sadist (1963)
- Salt of the Earth (1954)
- Santa Claus (1959)
- Santa Claus Conquers the Martians (1964)
- Satanis (1970)
- Scanners (1981)
- Scary Movie (1991)
- Scenes from the Class Struggle in Beverly Hills (1989)
- Schizoid (1980)
- Scissors (1991)
- Scream Blacula Scream (1973)
- Scream, Queen! My Nightmare on Elm Street (2019)
- Screaming Mimi (1958)
- Secret Ceremony (1968)
- Sex Madness (1938)
- Shack Out on 101 (1955)
- Shaft in Africa (1973)
- Shanks (1974)
- She Freak (1967)
- Shock (1977)
- Shock Corridor (1963)
- Shoot First, Die Later (1974)
- The Shooting (1967)
- The Shout (1978)
- Sid and Nancy (1986)
- The Sid Saga (1985)
- Silent Night, Deadly Night (1984)
- The Silent Partner (1978)
- Sister Street Fighter (1974)
- Sisters (1973)
- Skidoo (1968)
- The Slams (1974)
- The Slumber Party Massacre (1982)
- Smithereens (1982)
- Snapshot (1979)
- Solomon King (1974)
- Something Weird (1967)
- Some Call It Loving (1973)
- Sometimes Aunt Martha Does Dreadful Things (1971)
- Sonny Boy (1989)
- The Sorcerers (1967)
- Spider Baby (1967)
- Spine Tingler! The William Castle Story (2007)
- The Stepfather (1987)
- Strait-Jacket (1964)
- Strange Behavior (1981)
- The Strangler (1964)
- The Street Fighter (1974)
- Stunt Rock (1978)
- Stunts (1977)
- Suburbia (1983)
- Sugar Hill (1974)
- The Super Cops (1974)
- Super Fly (1972)
- Superstition (1982)
- Suspiria (1977)
- Swamp Thing (1982)
- The Swarm (1978)
- Sweet Jesus, Preacherman (1973)
- The Swinger (1966)
- The Sword of Doom (1966)
- Symbiopsychotaxiplasm (1968)
- The Take (1974)
- Taking Tiger Mountain (1983)
- Tarzan, the Ape Man (1981)
- The Tempest (1979)
- Tentacles (1977)
- Ten Violent Women (1982)
- Terminal Island (1973)
- The Terminal Man (1974)
- The Terror (1963)
- The Terror of Tiny Town (1938)
- TerrorVision (1986)
- The Texas Chainsaw Massacre 2 (1986)
- Thank God It's Friday (1978)
- Them! (1954)
- They Came from Beyond Space (1986)
- They Live (1988)
- The Thing That Couldn't Die (1958)
- Thrashin' (1986)
- Three the Hard Way (1974)
- Times Square (1980)
- The Tingler (1959)
- Tintorera (1977)
- Tokaido Yotsuya kaidan (1959)
- Tower of Evil (1972)
- The Town That Dreaded Sundown (1976)
- Trick Baby (1972)
- The Trip (1967)
- Trog (1970)
- Truck Turner (1974)
- Twice Upon a Time (1983)
- The Twilight People (1972)
- Twin Peaks: Fire Walk with Me (1992)
- Two Thousand Maniacs! (1964)
- Two-Lane Blacktop (1971)
- The Twonky (1953)
- UHF (1989)
- The Undertaker and His Pals (1966)
- Unholy Rollers (1972)
- The Unholy Three (1925)
- The Unknown (1927)
- Valley of the Dolls (1967)
- The Vampire Bat (1933)
- Vanishing Point (1971)
- The Velvet Vampire (1971)
- Venus in Furs (1969)
- Vibes (1988)
- Vigilante (1982)
- The Visitor (1979)
- Viva Knievel! (1977)
- The Wages of Fear (1953)
- Watermelon Man (1970)
- Welcome to the Dollhouse (1996)
- West of Zanzibar (1928)
- What Ever Happened to Baby Jane? (1962)
- What's the Matter with Helen? (1970)
- When a Stranger Calls (1979)
- White Lightning (1973)
- White Line Fever (1975)
- Who's That Girl (1987)
- Whoever Slew Auntie Roo? (1971)
- Wicked Stepmother (1989)
- Wicked, Wicked (1973)
- The Wicker Man (1973)
- Wigstock: The Movie (1995)
- Wild at Heart (1990)
- Wild Guitar (1962)
- Wild in the Streets (1968)
- Wild Seed (1965)
- Wild, Wild Planet (1966)
- Willard (1971)
- Willie Dynamite (1973)
- Witchboard (1986)
- The Witches (1966)
- Witchfinder General (1968)
- Without You I'm Nothing (1990)
- Women's Prison (1955)
- The World's Greatest Sinner (1963)
- Xanadu (1980)
- The Yakuza (1975)
- Zaat (1972)
- Zabriskie Point (1970)
- Zardoz (1974)
- Zig Zag (1970)
- The Zodiac Killer (1971)
- Zombies of Mora Tau (1957)
- Zotz! (1962)

== List of short films (under 45 minutes) in the TCM Underground block ==
- Age 13
- The Alphabet (1968)
- Always on Sunday
- The Amputee
- Ask Me, Don't Tell Me
- The Assignation
- The Bottle and the Throttle
- Boys Beware (1963)
- Bridge from No Place
- Changing
- The Corvair in Action!
- Dating Do's and Don'ts
- A Day in the Death of Donny B
- Delicious Dishes
- Destination Earth (1956)
- The Dropout
- Duck and Cover (1951)
- DumbLand
- Engagement Party
- Flowers of Darkness
- Fragment of Seeking
- Gang Boy
- The Golden Years (1960)
- Good Eating Habits
- The Grandmother (1970)
- Hazard House
- Holiday from Rules?
- The House in the Middle (1954)
- I Was a Teenage Serial Killer (1993)
- Keep Off the Grass
- LSD-25
- LSD: Insight or Insanity?
- Living Stereo
- Match Your Mood
- A Movable Feast
- A Movable Scene
- Movie Trailer
- Multiple SIDosis (1970)
- Narcotics: Pit of Despair February 24, 2023
- On the Edge
- One Got Fat (1963)
- Picnic (1948)
- Perversion for Profit
- Premonition Following an Evil Deed
- The Relaxed Wife
- R.F.D. Greenwich Village
- Right or Wrong (Making Moral Decisions)
- The Roman Springs on Mrs. Stone
- Shake Hands with Danger (1975)
- Signal 30
- Six Men Getting Sick (Six Times)
- Spy on the Fly
- Summer of '63
- Tear Gas in Law Enforcement
- The Terrible Truth (1951)
- Time Out for Trouble
- The Trip Back
- The Trouble Maker
- To Your Health
- Usher
- A Visit to Santa (1963)
- What Really Happened to Baby Jane
- When You Grow Up
- Wild at the Wheel
- The Wonderful World of Tupperware (1965)
- The Wormwood Star
- The Your Name Here Story

== See also ==
- Midnight movie
- B movie
- MonsterVision (a similar programming block formerly aired on sister network TNT)
- Mystery Science Theater 3000
- RiffTrax
