= Bioengineering in cinema =

Bioengineering in cinema refers to the depiction of biological engineering concepts, technologies, and innovation in film. This includes a wide range of topics such as genetic modification, cloning, synthetic biology, and biotechnology. These representations reflect the hopes, fears, and ethical concerns surrounding the potential applications and consequences of bioengineering.

== Background ==
Bioengineering is a multidisciplinary STEM field that applies the principles of engineering and biological sciences to design and develop technologies and solutions that improve healthcare, medicine, and living systems. Bridging the gap between engineering and life sciences, bioengineering is central to innovations in areas such as medical devices, biomaterials, and synthetic biology.

== Common concepts ==
Sci-fi movies that feature bioengineering highlight a range of scientific concepts, some grounded in real-world research, while others extrapolate into speculative directions. They help shape society's understanding (and misunderstanding) of the potential of bioengineering.

=== Cybernetics and biomechanical human augmentation ===
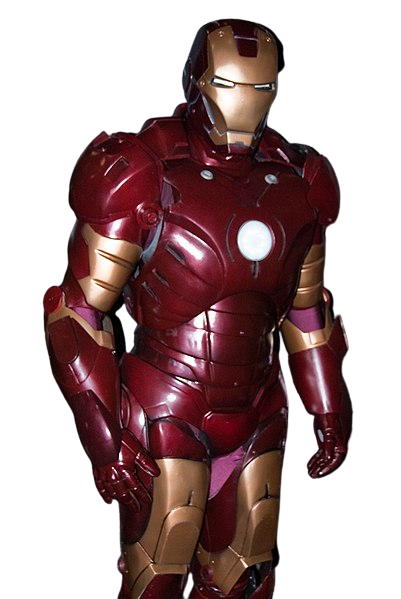
Tony Stark's iron exoskeleton suit is equipped with enhanced strength and flying capabilities.

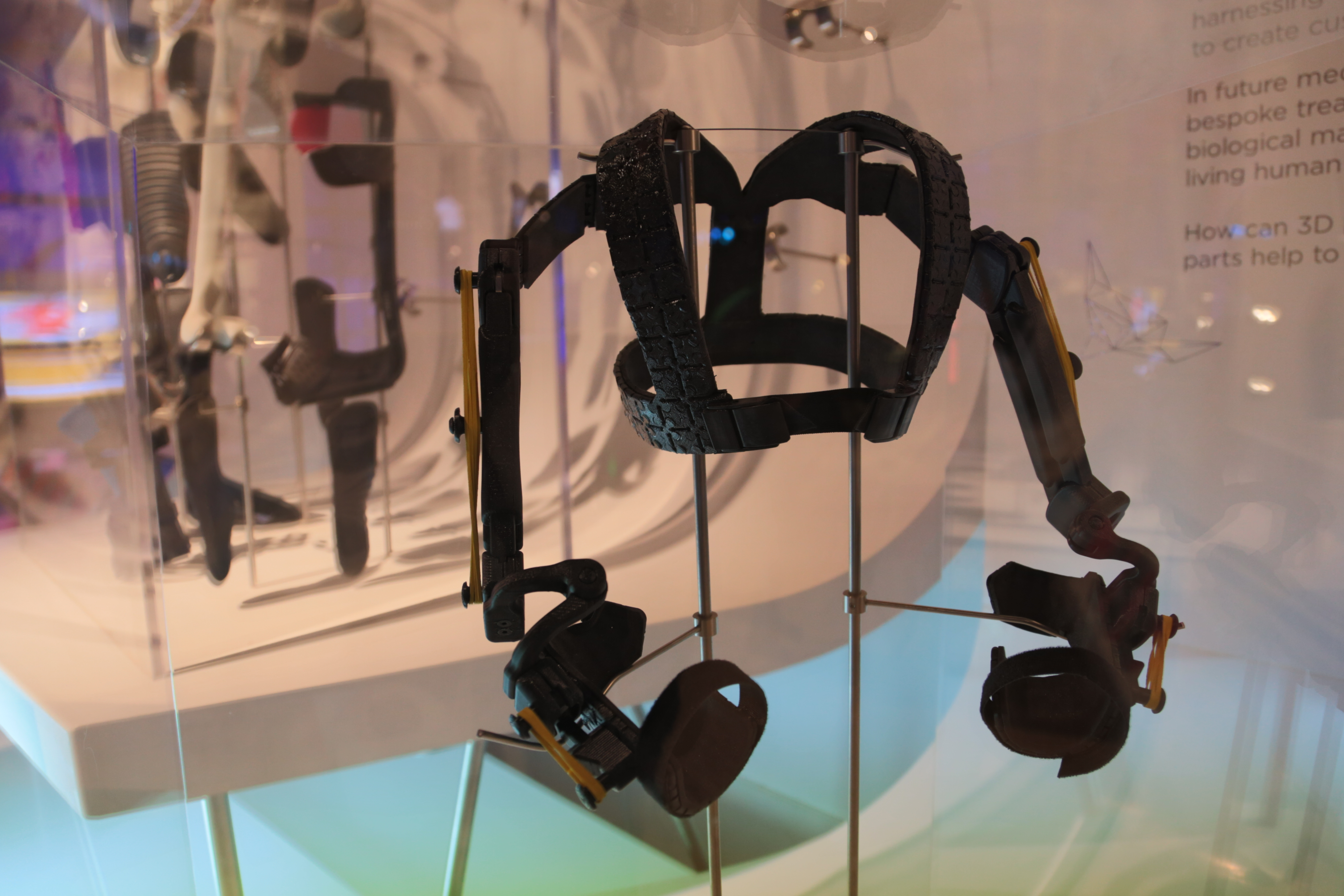
Exoskeletons support human movement and strength, primarily to assist with physical limitations.

The concept of cybernetics refers to the regulation of human-created systems via the utilization of similar feedback and response mechanisms seen in living organisms. American research scientists Manfred Clynes and Nathan Kline coined the term "cyborg" to describe the idea of merging humans with technology to enhance human senses (e.g. night vision goggles and exoskeletons for human power) and transcend traditional human limitations.

Clynes and Kline's interpretation of cybernetics is seen in the Marvel Cinematic Universe's Iron Man character. Iron Man, also known as Tony Stark, dons an iron exoskeleton that enhances his strength while also enabling him to fly.

Sci-fi movies also tend to portray cyborgs as individuals who have mechanical and/or electronic parts integrated into their bodies to enhance their capabilities beyond those of an average human. A cinematic portrayal of the relationship between cybernetics and human augmentation can be seen in the Winter Soldier character of the MCU. The Winter Soldier, or Bucky Barnes, undergoes cybernetic enhancement with a bionic arm, allowing for superhuman strength and integrated weaponry.

RoboCop is another example of cybernetics and human augmentation in cinema, focusing specifically on how computer-brain interfaces (CBIs) bridge human cognition and mechanical execution. Born from a human body aided with robotic technologies, RoboCop emerges as the ultimate anticrime machine with digital precision and prowess, thanks to his computer-assisted vision and enhanced cerebral processing.

=== Synthetic biology and artificial life ===
Synthetic biology is a branch of bioengineering where researchers and scientists redesign living systems and organisms to have new abilities and functions. In combining components that are not natural (and therefore synthetic) to generate chemical systems (therefore biological), synthetic biologists aim to construct new biological parts, systems, and even novel organisms that are not found in nature.

Blade Runner is a cinematic example of the intersection of synthetic bioengineering and artificial life. Set in a dystopian future, the story centers around replicants: bioengineered humanoids created to perform labor and serve humans. Grown in labs, these beings are synthetic organisms designed to mirror human appearance, intelligence, and emotion, and they also exhibit custom-built physiology to be stronger, faster, and more resilient than their human counterparts.

The movie, Splice, explores the concept of gene-splicing — a process which combines the DNA of two species, resulting in a chimeric or hybrid being. The story of Splice revolves around two scientists who spliced together human and animal DNA, creating a novel human-animal hybrid that exhibits both human and animal characteristics. Similarly, in Jurassic Park, through synthetic biology technologies, a brand-new dinosaur species, the Indominus Rex, was created by combining the genetic makeup of a T-Rex and the DNA from Velociraptors, Giganotosaurus, cuttlefish, tree frogs, and snakes.

=== Genetic engineering and cloning ===
The identification of DNA as the unit of heredity and the basis for the central dogma theory of molecular biology have influenced researchers and scientists to pursue experiments to understand how DNA control heredity. Through genetic engineering and molecular biology technologies, researchers have been able to modify DNA sequences to create organisms with desirable traits.

In April 2025, Colossal Biosciences used cloning and gene-editing to create three genetically modified wolf pups. Edits were made to key grey wolf genes to recreate distinctive dire wolf traits.

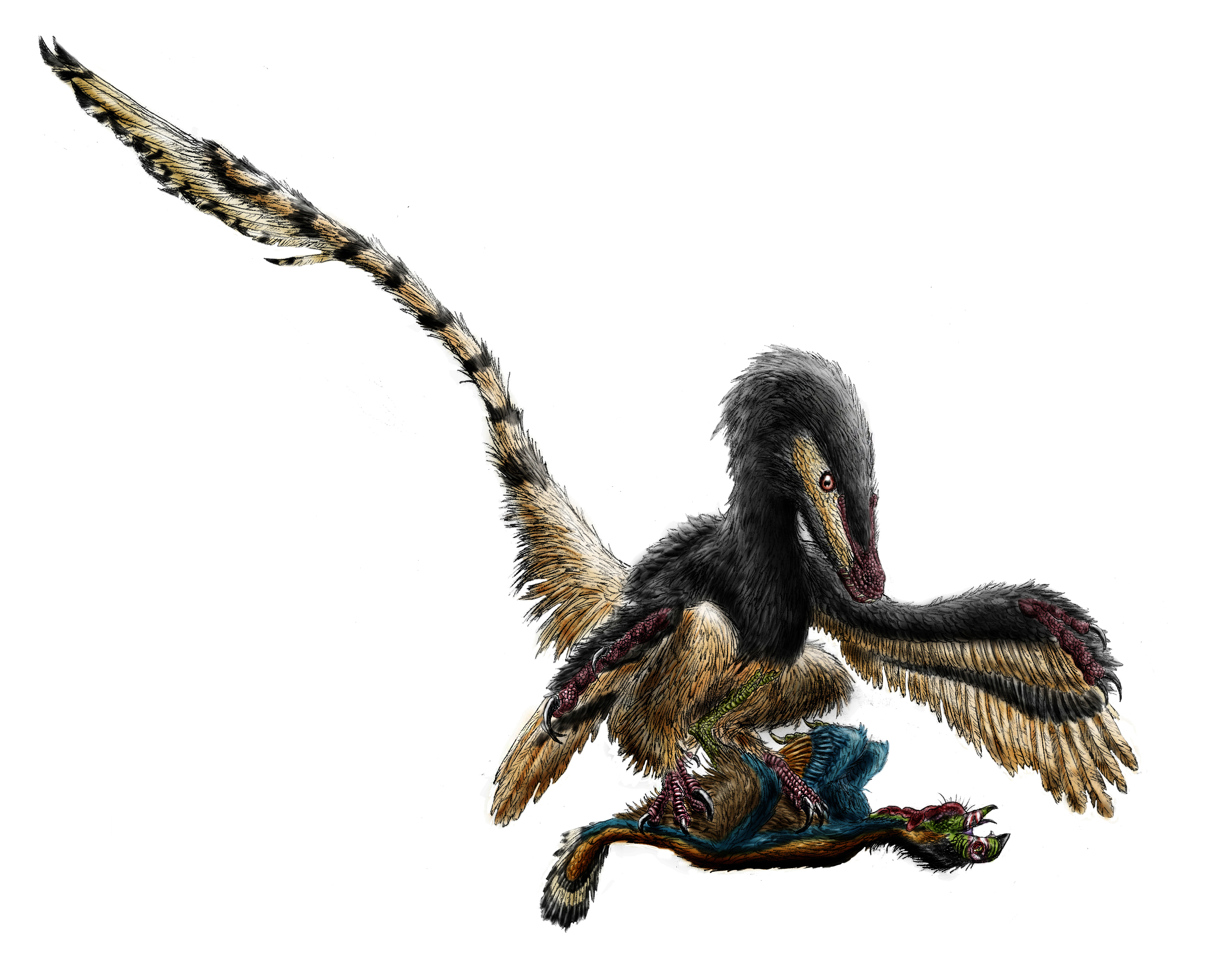
The Velociraptor was one of the main dinosaurs resurrected using gene editing technologies in Jurassic Park.

The premise of GATTACA revolves around a futuristic society in which its members routinely use recombinant DNA technologies for family planning. In this society, eggs and sperm are used to produce embryos that are screened for genes that code for desired and undesired traits. Those who are born with the aid of genetic engineering are considered "superior" and qualify for high-level professional employment, while those who were conceived by traditional means are considered "invalid."

While genetic engineering is most commonly known for creating GMOs and pest-resilient crops, it has also been used to clone and resurrect extinct species (Dolly the sheep and dire wolves). In Jurassic Park, extinct dinosaur species were resurrected by reconstructing their DNA from disintegrated chromosomes with frog genome. In Alien: Resurrection, Ellen Ripley, a transgenic clone of both human and alien DNA, was artificially reincarnated using cellular traces of a Ripley impregnated by an alien.

== Future directions ==
As technology continues to advance, the role of bioengineering in addressing global health and living system challenges grows at an increasing rate. Areas of rapid growth include precision medicine, computer-brain interfaces, and bio fabrication applications. The imaginative representation of bioengineering in cinema continues to evolve alongside real-world developments, blurring the lines between fiction and future reality.
