= Nathan Kline Institute for Psychiatric Research =

US research institute

Coordinates: 41.044395°N 73.968561°W

The Nathan S. Kline Institute for Psychiatric Research (NKI) is a New York State-funded research Institute, located in Orangeburg, New York.

NKI is dedicated to research designed to better understand the causes of mental illnesses, and to improving the lives of people with mental illness. The institute is named after psychiatrist Nathan S. Kline, MD who died in 1982.

NKI is a facility of the New York State Office of Mental Health that has earned a national and international reputation for its pioneering contributions in psychiatric research, especially in the areas of psychopharmacological treatments for schizophrenia and major mood disorders, mechanisms of Alzheimer's disease and epilepsy, and in the application of computer technology to mental health services. Since 1952, interdisciplinary teams of distinguished NKI scientists have applied their talents and expertise to study the etiology, treatment, prevention, and rehabilitation of severe and persistent mental illnesses.

Located on the grounds of Rockland Psychiatric Center in Orangeburg, New York (20 miles north of New York City), NKI receives additional operating support from federal, municipal, and private sources through the Research Foundation for Mental Hygiene. NKI has a strong academic collaboration with the Department of Psychiatry of New York University.

A broad range of studies are conducted at NKI, including basic, clinical, and services research, intended to improve care for people suffering from complex, psychobiologically based, severely disabling mental disorders.

They focus primarily on patient-oriented research programs emphasizing the causes, diagnosis, treatment, prevention, and care of severe and long-term mental disorders; clinically relevant, basic research on physiological and biochemical aspects of mental disease; and research on the cost, quality, and effectiveness of services for patients in mental health programs certified, operated, or funded by New York State.
