= A Day in the Death (disambiguation) =

"A Day in the Death" is the eighth episode of the second series of British science fiction television series Torchwood.

A Day in the Death may also refer to:

== Theatre, film and TV ==
- A Day in the Death of Joe Egg, 1967 play by the English playwright Peter Nichols
- A Day in the Death of Joe Egg (film), 1972 film based on the play of the same name by Peter Nichols
- A Day in the Death of Donny B, 1969 American short docudrama

== Music ==
- "A Day in the Death", song from Testament album Dark Roots of Earth
- "A Day in the Death", song from Johnny Truant album In the Library of Horrific Events
