= The Golden Years (1960 film) =

- Directed by: Jamison Handy
- Produced by: Jamison Handy
- Production company: A Jam Handy Picture
- Distributed by: Brunswick
- Release date: 1960
- Running time: 14 minutes
- Country: United States
- Language: English

The Golden Years is a 1960 American short sponsored film directed by Jamison Handy for the Jam Handy Organization promoting bowling as a family sport. It features a populuxe bowling alley where a family of four is having fun. It is in the public domain.

The film, along with many others considered to be time-capsule chronicles of their period, has been frequently classified as camp and shown as filler within Turner Classic Movies' Saturday night–Sunday morning film showcase series, TCM Underground.

== Plot summary ==
Promotional film which demonstrates Brunswick Gold Crown line of bowling alley recreational seats, ball returns, foul buzzers, subway returns and inline units, hand dryers, power lifts and overhead projectors, classic beauty and twin line masking units and automatic pinsetter machines.
