= Rockland Psychiatric Center =

- New York State Office of Mental Health
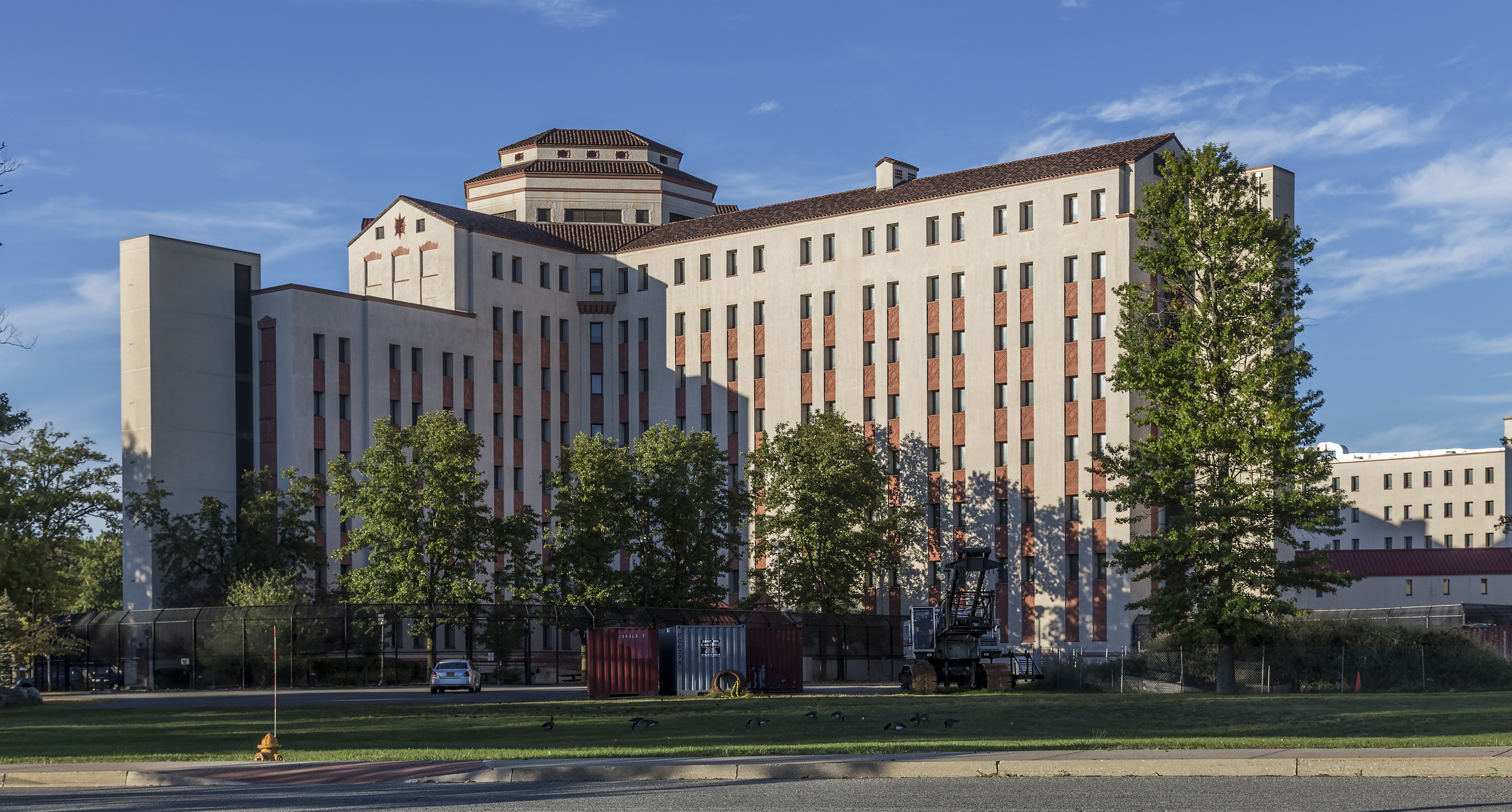
- The current main buildings at the Rockland Psychiatric Center in 2015

Geography
- Location: Orangeburg, New York, United States
- Coordinates: 41°02′57.72″N 73°58′07.7″W

Organization
- Type: Specialist
- Affiliated university: Nathan Kline Institute for Psychiatric Research

Services
- Speciality: Psychiatric hospital

History
- Former name: Rockland State Hospital
- Opened: 1926

Links
- Website: www.omh.ny.gov/omhweb/facilities/rppc
- Lists: Hospitals in New York State

The Rockland Psychiatric Center, originally Rockland State Hospital, in Orangeburg, New York, is a psychiatric facility for adults operated by the New York State Office of Mental Health. It offers in-patient and transitional treatment for adults, as well as research facilities. There are 13 outpatient facilities and 11 residential programs in the four surrounding counties. The facility shares space with the co-located Nathan Kline Institute. The inpatient treatment center has 410 beds. The current hospital replaces an older hospital on the same 615-acre (249 ha) site.

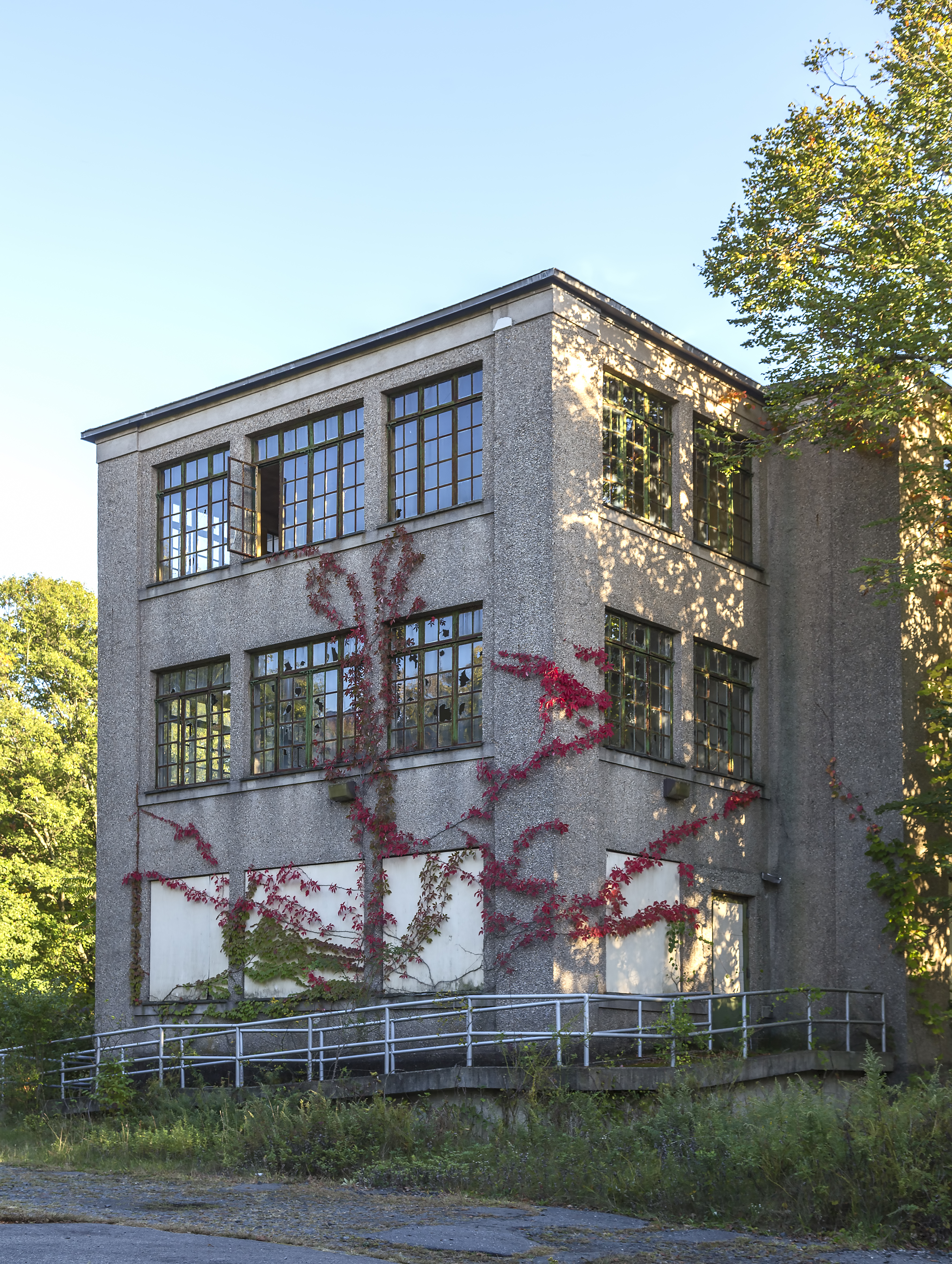
Abandoned Rockland State Hospital building in 2015

== History ==
Rockland State Hospital was originally established in 1926 by the State of New York. Dr. Russell Blaisdell was appointed the hospital's first superintendent in July 1930, and its first patients were admitted in January 1931. Blaisdell created a new method of classifying patients, streamlined admissions, and took particular interest in children's care, culminating in the creation of a Children's Group unit and a separate building on campus for that purpose in 1936. Rockland began employing insulin shock therapy in 1937, and later, electroconvulsive therapy. By its peak in 1959 Rockland had more than 9000 residents and a staff of 2000 on a sprawling campus. In 1970, the Children's Group unit closed, its services moved to a new building by a new name, the Rockland Children's Psychiatric Center immediately to the west of the existing original Rockland campus.

In the meantime, by the decade of the 1970s the overall inpatient population had been greatly reduced at Rockland by the evolving practice of deinstitutionalization. The hospital's name was changed to Rockland Psychiatric Center in 1974. By 2010, the Rockland Children's Psychiatric Center had closed, and services were moved once again, this time to the Rockland Children's Center, a 56-bed facility also on the sprawling Rockland Campus. In the meantime, the site of the shut down Rockland Children's Psychiatric Center was repurposed as a filming location for the Netflix television series Orange is the New Black.

The oldest abandoned buildings on the Rockland campus that are still standing are generally closed to the public. The campus at its largest size once represented one of the largest intact psychiatric hospital facilities in the United States.

In 2003, the state of New York sold the former hospital campus no longer in active use to the Town of Orangetown. In 2017, 60 acres of the land containing abandoned buildings were sold to JPMorgan Chase for the construction of a data center, and significant demolition of most buildings in that parcel was completed in 2018.
