= Gary Schlosser =

American film producer

Gary Joseph Schlosser (born c.1937) is a film producer who was most active in the late 1960s and early 1970s. He is best known for co-producing the 1966 film Cowboy, for which he was nominated for an Academy Award for Best Documentary, Short Subjects in 1967. He served as associate editor on the US Information Agency short film Africa Goes to the Fair (1967). Schlosser also served as executive producer of the cinéma vérité documentary film series The Social Seminar, produced by the University of California at Los Angeles for the National Institute of Mental Health from 1970 to 1972.

Schlosser was born in Ohio and grew up in Pittsburgh, Pennsylvania.

After graduating from Syracuse University, Schlosser married Anne Griffin in 1965.
