= The Social Seminar =

The Social Seminar is a series of educational films for adults produced by the Extension Media Center of the University of California at Los Angeles in 1971. The original full name of the series was "The Social Seminar: Education, Drugs, and Society." The series was executive produced by Gary Schlosser, an Oscar-nominated producer of short-subject documentaries. The films were distributed nationally, for example to state educational film offices. The series was produced for the National Institute of Mental Health as a "multi-media training series."

Fifteen films were produced for The Social Seminar series: "Changing" (30 min., color), "The Family" (30 min., B&W), "News Story" (30 min., color), "Youth Culture Series" (1 hr., color), "Drugs and Beyond" (30 min., color), "Brian at Seventeen" (30 min., B&W), "Jordan Paul: One Teacher's Approach" (30 min., B&W), "What is Teaching? What is Learning?" (30 min., color), "Mr. Edler's Class: Drug Education at the Elementary Level" (30 min., color), "Drug Talk: Some Current Drug Programs (30 min., color), "Understanding: A New Institution" (6 min., B&W), "Community in Quest" (30 min., color), and "Meeting" (30 min., B&W). The longest film, the hour-long "Youth Culture Series," consisted of four segments each focusing on a specific young adult; these segments were named "Guy," "Bunny," "Tom," and "Teddy."

The first nine films in the series depict, in a cinema-verite style without voiceover or introduction, aspects of the lives of a selected person or family as they dealt with personal, interpersonal, and societal change. For example, the film "Changing" shows how one man's reevaluation of his life and social standing led to his becoming a "hippie" in the eyes of his family and coworkers; though his home life was enhanced, he found himself increasingly socially isolated. The remaining six films focus on various ways that educators, families, and communities attempt to solve societal problems.

Several of the films are part of the Prelinger Archive and are available freely online. In June 2011, "Changing" was featured on the Turner Classic Movies series TCM Underground.

== In popular culture ==
- Electronic music duo Boards of Canada sampled dialogue from the "Tom" episode of The Social Seminar in their song "Chromakey Dreamcoat", from the album The Campfire Headphase.
- British rock band Bastille sampled dialogue from the "Changing" episode of The Social Seminar in their songs "Fake It" and "Four Walls (The Ballad of Perry Smith)", from the album Wild World.
