= Biological engineering =

Integration of biology and engineering

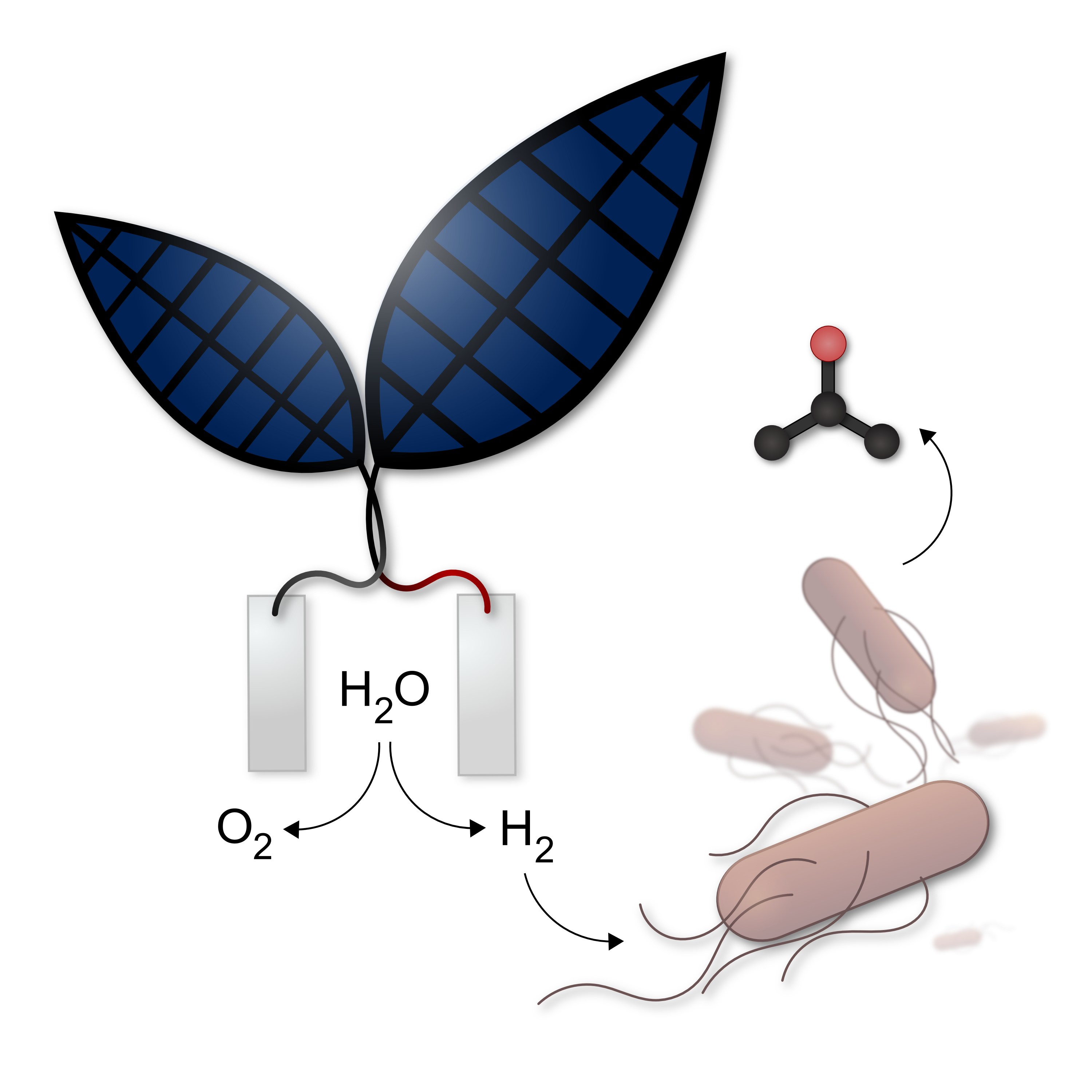
A bioengineered leaf to convert sunlight into liquid fuel

Biological engineering or bioengineering is the application of principles of biology and the tools of engineering to create usable, tangible, economically viable products that support health care. Biological engineering applies knowledge and expertise from various basic and applied sciences, including biomechanics, bioinformatics, thermodynamics, polymer science, medical imaging, and tissue engineering, among others. One source defined bioengineering as advancing the "fundamental understanding of how biological systems operate and to develop effective biology-based technologies for applications across a wide spectrum of societal needs including breakthroughs in diagnosis, treatment, and prevention of disease."

Generally, biological engineers attempt to mimic biological systems to create products or modify and control biological systems. Bioengineers use traditional engineering principles and techniques to address biological processes, including ways to replace, augment, sustain, or predict chemical and mechanical processes.

== History ==
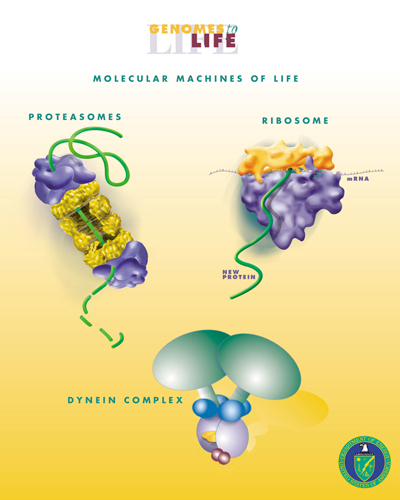
Some biological machines

Biological engineering is a science-based discipline founded upon the biological sciences and chemical engineering, electrical engineering, and mechanical engineering. It can be based upon chemistry, electricity and magnetism, and classical mechanics, respectively.

Biological engineering or "bioengineering" was coined by British scientist and broadcaster Heinz Wolff in 1954 at the National Institute for Medical Research. Wolff graduated that year and became the Division of Biological Engineering director at Oxford University.

When engineers and life scientists started working together, they recognized that the engineers did not know enough about the actual biology behind their work. To resolve this problem, engineers who wanted to get into biological engineering, devoted more time to studying biology, psychology, agriculture and medicine.

More recently, the term biological engineering has been applied to environmental modifications such as surface soil protection, slope stabilization, water course and shoreline protection, windbreaks, vegetation barriers including noise barriers and visual screens, and the ecological enhancement of an area. Because other engineering disciplines also address living organisms, the term biological engineering can be applied more broadly to include agricultural engineering.

The first biological engineering program in the United States was started at University of California, San Diego in 1966. More recent programs have been launched at MIT and Utah State University. Many old agricultural engineering departments in universities over the world have re-branded themselves as agricultural and biological engineering or agricultural and biosystems engineering. According to Professor Doug Lauffenburger of MIT, biological engineering has a broad base which applies engineering principles to an enormous range of size and complexities of systems, ranging from the molecular level (molecular biology, biochemistry, microbiology, pharmacology, protein chemistry, cytology, immunology, neurobiology and, neuroscience) to cellular and tissue-based systems (including devices and sensors), to whole macroscopic organisms (plants, animals), and even to biomes and ecosystems.

== Education ==
The average length of study is three to five years, and the completed degree is signified as a bachelor of engineering (B.S. in engineering). Fundamental courses include thermodynamics, biomechanics, biology, genetic engineering, fluid and mechanical dynamics, chemical and enzyme kinetics, electronics, and materials properties.

== Sub-disciplines ==
Modeling of the spread of disease using Cellular Automata and Nearest Neighbor Interactions

Depending on the institution and particular definitional boundaries employed, some major branches of bioengineering may be categorized as (note these may overlap):

- Biomedical engineering: application of engineering principles and design concepts to medicine and biology for healthcare purposes.
  - Tissue engineering
  - Neural engineering
  - Genetic engineering
  - Pharmaceutical engineering
  - Clinical engineering
  - Biomechanics
- Biochemical engineering: fermentation engineering, application of engineering principles to microscopic biological systems that are used to create new products by synthesis, including the production of protein from suitable raw materials.
- Biological systems engineering: application of engineering principles and design concepts to agriculture, food sciences, and ecosystems.
- Bioprocess engineering: develop technology to monitor the conditions of where a particular process takes place, (Ex: bioprocess design, biocatalysis, bioseparation, bioenergy)
- Environmental health engineering: application of engineering principles to control the environment for the health, comfort, and safety of human beings. It includes the field of life-support systems for the exploration of outer space and the ocean.
- Human factors and ergonomics engineering: application of engineering, physiology, and psychology to the optimization of the human-machine relationship. (Ex: physical ergonomics, cognitive ergonomics, human–computer interaction)
- Biotechnology: the use of living systems and organisms to develop or make products. (Ex: pharmaceuticals, Bioinformatics, Genetic engineering.)
- Biomimetics: the imitation of models, systems, and elements of nature to solve complex human problems. (Ex: velcro, designed after George de Mestral noticed how easily burs stuck to a dog's hair.)
- Bioelectrical engineering
- Biomechanical engineering: is the application of mechanical engineering principles and biology to determine how these areas relate and how they can be integrated to potentially improve human health.
- Bionics: an integration of Biomedical, focused more on the robotics and assisted technologies. (Ex: prosthetics)
- Bioprinting: utilizing biomaterials to print cells, tissues and organs.
- Biorobotics: utilizing advanced electronics and sensors to make prosthetics or biohybrid robots.
- Systems biology: Molecules, cells, organs, and organisms are all investigated in terms of their interactions and behaviors.

== Organizations ==
- Accreditation Board for Engineering and Technology (ABET), the U.S.-based accreditation board for engineering B.S. programs, makes a distinction between biomedical engineering and biological engineering, though there is much overlap (see above).
- American Institute for Medical and Biological Engineering (AIMBE) is made up of 1,500 members. Their main goal is to educate the public about the value biological engineering has in our world, as well as invest in research and other programs to advance the field. They give out awards to those dedicated to innovation in the field, and awards of achievement in the field. (They do not have a direct contribution to biological engineering; they recognize those who do and encourage the public to continue that forward movement).
- Institute of Biological Engineering (IBE) is a non-profit organization that runs on donations alone. They aim to encourage the public to learn and to continue advancements in biological engineering. (Like AIMBE, they do not perform research directly; however, they offer scholarships to students who show promise in the field).
- Society for Biological Engineering (SBE) is a technological community associated with the American Institute of Chemical Engineers (AIChE). SBE hosts international conferences, and is a global organization of leading engineers and scientists dedicated to advancing the integration of biology with engineering.
- MediUnite Journal is a medical awareness campaign and newspaper that has often published biomedical findings and has cited biomedicine in various research papers.

== See also ==
- Bioengineering in cinema
