= Carl Fick =

American film director

Carl Metcalfe Fick (September 23, 1918 – February 23, 1990) was an American documentary film director and author. He was best known for the Cannes award-winning short docudrama A Day in the Death of Donny B (1969), as well as his novels The Danziger Transcript (1971) and A Disturbance in Paris (1982). He also co-authored and ghost wrote From Mexico with Death (1977) with Jose Luis Guzman.

== Early life ==
Fick was born in Evanston, Illinois, in September 1918.

He attended Cornell University, graduating in 1940 with a Bachelor of Arts degree. While an undergraduate, he wrote a weekly column for The Trumansburg Leader newspaper.

In 1941, he married Shirley Stevens Stuart in Bronxville, New York.

After graduating, he went to work for Collier's magazine as a staff writer. His career was interrupted when the United States entered World War II, and Fick went to serve in England with the U.S. Army Air Forces.

== Career as a filmmaker ==
After the war ended, Fick returned to the States and became involved in filmmaking, in addition to continuing to write for magazines. He wrote scripts for several television and film productions, including a conversion of the Whit Masterson novel, A Shadow in the Wild. He produced and directed several documentary short films, including the anti-drug docudrama A Day in the Death of Donny B in 1969, which won several awards.

== Career as an author ==
Fick went on to write a novel, The Danziger Transcript, first published in 1971. It was a commercial successful and later turned into a two-act play by Robert Bressard.

His last novel was A Disturbance in Paris in 1982, which was met with mixed reviews from critics. Both The Danziger Transcript and A Disturbance in Paris include storylines and central characters which reflected Fick's long career in journalism and writing.

== Later life and death ==
Fick died in New York City, New York in February 1990 at the age of 71. He was survived by his wife Shirley, who died in Dexter, Maine, in August 1998 at the age of 79.
