= The Distant Drummer =

- Directed by: William Templeton
- Written by: Don Peterson
- Produced by: Frank Kavanaugh
- Narrated by: Robert Mitchum; Rod Steiger; Paul Newman
- Cinematography: Charles E. Francis
- Edited by: James E. Carpenter
- Music by: E. Robert Velazco
- Running time: 22 minutes
- Country: US
- Language: English

The Distant Drummer is a series of four 22-minute American documentary films produced in the early 1970s as a societal warning against the proliferation of drugs during the counterculture of the 1960s. Directed by William Templeton and written by Don Peterson, the series was produced by Airlie Foundation and George Washington University Department of Medical and Public Affairs and lists "in cooperation with" credits for the American Academy of General Practice, the District of Columbia Medical Society and the National Institute of Mental Health.

== Narrated by Robert Mitchum, Rod Steiger and Paul Newman ==
The first film, A Movable Scene, focuses on the rise of the counterculture and its association with marijuana use, while the second film, A Movable Feast puts additional spotlight on marijuana and expands the view to include injected methadrine, cigarettes, alcohol, coffee and over-the-counter medications. Both films were released in 1970 and were narrated by Robert Mitchum who, at the time of the films' release, was top-billed in one of the year's leading productions, Ryan's Daughter. Mitchum, who had been arrested in September 1948 for possession of marijuana and served 43 days at a California prison farm (the conviction was overturned in January 1951), subsequently narrated the 1973 anti-marijuana-and-LSD documentary short America on the Rocks.

Bridge from No Place

Flowers of Darkness

The third entry in the series, Bridge from No Place, narrated by Rod Steiger, was released in 1971 and centers upon the experience of drug culture. Addicts, including Vietnam War soldiers describe what it feels like to be addicted and treatment options are discussed.

The fourth and final Distant Drummer film, Flowers of Darkness concerns the dangers associated with heroin sale and addiction. A visit is paid to the California-based drug treatment program Synanon, while drug enforcement agents, along with police officers, describe the crime brought on by drugs. The short was released in 1972, with narration voiced by Paul Newman.

== Robert Mitchum's narration ==
Opening lines in Robert Mitchum's narration of the first Distant Drummer film, A Movable Scene:
"This is the straightened society. The orderly, well-managed, well-disciplined world of the establishment. It is made possible by the Protestant ethic. Work is noble – worldly achievement a sign of God's favor. But not everyone embraces these hallmarks of success. In each city across the land there exists another culture whose very philosophy and way of life rejects the fierce competition and its material rewards… and, in so doing, refutes the order of discipline of the establishment. The hippies, perhaps more than any other social phenomenon, brought the drug issue to the surface. But most of them are children of middle-class and upper-class families.

Thousands of snapshots on police station walls remain the only link between many of America's most affluent families and the children who embodied their great expectations. Nearly everyone in the hippie community smokes marijuana – whether they call it pot, grass, hemp, gage, joint or mary jane – the marijuana is the basic background for the shared drug experience. The experience is shared to such an extent that roach pipes are always in demand – a roach is a marijuana butt and it requires some form of holder for those last few drags. The new generation, whether they are runaways or rebels-in-residence, use marijuana as a symbol of discontent with the basic values of the establishment. For some, there exists a social imperative beyond flaunting society's rules – for these adventurers the mind-expanding drugs open a window on a whole new frontier..."

== Counterculture and anti-drug documentaries as historical artifacts ==
Alongside such familiar counterculture documentaries as Michael Wadleigh's Woodstock, which was also released the same year as A Movable Scene and A Movable Feast, a number of little-known and rarely-seen features and short films depicting the hippie era were also produced in the early 1970s and remain as time-capsule chronicles of their period. Because of the didactic stridency associated with some of these films' anti-drug lecturing, the productions have been frequently classified as camp and shown as fillers at Turner Classic Movies' Saturday night–Sunday morning film showcase series, TCM Underground.
