= Cowboy (1966 film) =

1966 film

- Directed by: Michael Ahnemann
- Written by: Michael Ahnemann
- Produced by: Michael Ahnemann; Gary Schlosser
- Edited by: Michael Ahnemann
- Music by: Laurindo Almeida
- Distributed by: United States Information Agency
- Release date: 1966
- Running time: 17 minutes
- Country: United States
- Language: English

Cowboy is a 1966 American short documentary film directed by Michael Ahnemann and produced by Ahnemann and Gary Schlosser. It was nominated for an Academy Award for Best Documentary Short.

== See also ==
- List of American films of 1966
