= Sid Davis =

American film director (1916–2006)

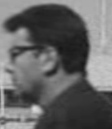
- Davis in Boys Beware (1961)
- Born: April 1, 1916; Chicago, Illinois, U.S.
- Died: October 16, 2006 (aged 90); Palm Desert, California, U.S.
- Occupations: Stand-in; educational film producer
- Spouse: Norma Henkins (m. 1941; died 1996)

Sidney Davis (April 1, 1916 – October 16, 2006) was an American director and producer who specialized in social guidance films.

== Early life ==
Davis was born on April 1, 1916, in Chicago, Illinois to a seamstress mother and a housepainter father. The family moved to Los Angeles, California in 1920, when Davis was four years old. That year, he began working as a child actor; for example, he was featured in a comedy made by Harold Lloyd. He dropped out of junior-high school to help support his parents. When he was older, he often worked as a stand-in for Leif Erickson and John Wayne.

== Filmmaking career ==
Sid Davis's first film, The Dangerous Stranger (1949)

In November 1949, Linda Joyce Glucoft, a six-year-old girl in Los Angeles, California, was molested and murdered by a man named Fred Stroble. The story made front-page news in the Los Angeles Times for a week as police and the FBI searched for Stroble. The story was picked up by Time Magazine and other national media and led to a flurry of reported rapes and attempted rapes. Some media began to speculate that the supposed epidemic of rape was simply media manipulation of public perception.

Davis stated that the tragedy particularly disturbed him because his daughter Jill, then six years old herself, did not seem to pay attention to his warnings about strangers. Davis talked to John Wayne saying that a film about this should be made, and Wayne suggested that Davis make the film. Wayne gave Davis $1,000 ($13531.47 when adjusted for inflation) and used the money to make his first film, The Dangerous Stranger, a film he would remake at least twice over the next 30 years. The film tells the story of several young children—some of the children are kidnapped and eventually saved, others are kidnapped and never seen again. Davis used schoolchildren and police officers instead of professional actors. Peter L. Stein of the San Francisco Chronicle said "[t]he film was a success among schools and police departments".

Davis sold copies of the film to schools and police departments, reaping a $250,000 profit. He used the money to make more than 150 films over the next few decades. Davis' films are typically 10 to 30 minutes long; he prided himself on making each one for $1,000, a minuscule film budget even at that time. Due to the content of his films, people referred to him as the "King of Calamity".

His films cover topics such as driver safety, marijuana use, heroin addiction, and gang warfare. Live and Learn (1951), a fairly famous Davis film, features Jill cutting out paper dolls in her room. When her father comes home, she jumps up to greet him, trips on the carpet, and impales herself on the scissors. Other children in the film are equally unlucky—falling off cliffs, being run over by cars, or losing vision in one eye from flying shards of glass.

Boys Beware (1961)

One of Davis' most notorious films, Boys Beware (1961), produced with the cooperation of the Inglewood, California Police Department and the Inglewood Unified School District, warns boys of the perceived dangers of male homosexuals, conflating them with pedophiles. The film's thesis is explained through the following line:

"What Jimmy didn't know was that Ralph was sick—a sickness that was not visible like smallpox, but no less dangerous and contagious—a sickness of the mind. You see, Ralph was a homosexual: a person who demands an intimate relationship with members of their own sex."

Many commentators have argued that the film spread hateful stereotypes against homosexual men. Writing for Film Threat, Phil Hall opined in 2006 that "It might be easy to laugh at the stupidity of Boys Beware if the film wasn't so virulent in equating homosexuality and pedophilia. [...] Films like Boys Beware reinforced a culture of homophobia which is only recently being chipped away by voices of intelligence and common sense."

The same year, Davis made Girls Beware, warning girls not to put themselves into situations where they would be defenseless, a topic that Davis had covered at least 10 years earlier in his film Name Unknown, in which a man used a gun to accost a couple in isolated surroundings, forcing the boy into the trunk of the car and raping the girl.

Also in 1961, Davis made the film Seduction of the Innocent, targeting teenagers with the message that marijuana use leads to heroin addiction, a message that many marijuana activists dispute as an example of a slippery slope fallacy. The film follows a teenage girl through her use of "reds", "pep pills", and 7-Up, to her first puff of marijuana, to her addiction to heroin, to her fate as a prostitute arrested on her twentieth birthday, "lost to society". The film promises that "she'll continue her hopeless, degrading existence until she escapes in death."

In 1964 his company Sid Davis Productions distributed his film Too Tough to Care, aimed at undermining teenage resistance to anti-smoking education. The film used satire and humor, in a short story with no narration, to illustrate the misleading claims of cigarette advertising – an unconventional approach for its genre. The film garnered positive reviews in the mainstream press as well as coverage in academic journals.

Davis' work is consistently about a relatively small group of themes: that strangers must be treated with caution, that the world itself is an unfriendly place, regardless of the presence of strangers, and that children must think before acting. His films typically feature monotonous narration suffused with what Mental Hygiene author Ken Smith calls a "sledgehammer morality." His work is anecdotal and unsupported by evidence, and is notorious among social guidance films because Davis covered topics that scholarly film producers such as Coronet Films and Encyclopædia Britannica did not address. Coronet, Centron Corporation, and Britannica typically had teams of scholars with PhDs in sociology who guided development of their films. Davis, when he used consultants, rarely used anyone with a degree in a relevant field, instead he used policemen and detectives for their anecdotal advice.

Aside from his social warning films generally known for their bleakness, inaccuracy and simplistic presentations, Davis made some police training films such as Shotgun or Sidearm? (explaining which situations call for which firearms) and military films such as LAPES and PLADS (explaining delivery systems developed to allow planes to drop supplies onto exact locations in generally hostile territory in Vietnam).

Two atypical films in his social warning film canon are Gang Boy (1954) and Age 13 (1955). Both were written and directed by Art Swerdloff. In Gang Boy, Mexican and Anglo gangs in southern California declare a truce and begin working together to make a better world for their younger siblings. The film was based on a true story that happened in Pomona, California, in the 1950s.

After a few years of directing films, Davis continued as a cinematographer for his company, Sid Davis Productions, hiring others such as Art Swerdloff, Robert D. Ellis, and Ib Melchior to write and direct. Later he hired cinematographers to lens the films as well as office workers to distribute them and spent his time enjoying his hobby of mountain climbing.

Davis became involved in the real estate market in Los Angeles during the 1950s, at a time when it was booming due to development resulting from the influx of people to work in the defense industry. Through income from his films, work as a stand-in, and real estate investments, Davis became a multimillionaire.

Later in his life, Davis became famous among mountain climbers, securing the world record for climbing California's Mt. San Jacinto, climbing it 643 times over his life, the last time on September 1, 1998, at age 82.

== Filmography ==
Margalit Fox of The New York Times wrote "Mr. Davis lost count of all the films he made, but there seem to have been at least 150, perhaps as many as 200." Fox, in the year 2006, said "[t]o modern audiences, Mr. Davis's work can look like high camp. Some of his films have aged strikingly badly, in particular Boys Beware,[...]" Rick Prelinger, a historian specializing in nontheatrical films, stated that some of Davis's works had, in 2006, artistic merit, citing Age 13 and Gang Boy.

=== Availability of his films ===
Davis' films Age 13, Gang Boy, The Terrible Truth (another anti-drug film), and The Dropout are available on Volume 5 of Rick Prelinger's CD-ROM set Our Secret Century. His films The Terrible Truth and Boys Beware, are available online at archive.org here and here, respectively. His Film, The ABC of Walking Wisely, and a short, Santa and the Fairy Snow Queen, are available in digital form, with humorous commentary, from Rifftrax, an entertainment group made of performers previously with the similar Mystery Science Theater 3000.

== Personal life ==
In 1941 he met Norma Henkins, who worked as a film extra. Six months later, the two married. He had a daughter, Jill. Norma Henkins died in 1996.

== Death ==
Davis died in his house on October 16, 2006, in Palm Desert, California, at age 90, of lung cancer. At the time of his death, he had a companion, Shirley Friesen, and a grandson.
