= Daryn Okada =

American cinematographer

- Born: 2 January 1960 (age 66)
- Years active: 1978–present

Daryn Okada, A.S.C. (born January 2, 1960) is a cinematographer and the former president of the American Society of Cinematographers.

In 2015, Okada joined the board of governors of the Academy of Motion Picture Arts and Sciences.

== Filmography ==
=== Film ===
Year	Title	Director
1984	Nomad Riders	Frank Roach
1984	Monaco Forever	William A. Levey
1988	Phantasm II	Don Coscarelli
1988	Survival Quest	Don Coscarelli
1991	Wild Hearts Can't Be Broken	Steve Miner
1992	Captain Ron	Thom Eberhardt
1993	Airborne	Rob Bowman
1994	My Father the Hero	Steve Miner
1996	Big Bully	Steve Miner
1996	Black Sheep	Penelope Spheeris
1997	Anna Karenina	Bernard Rose
1998	Senseless	Penelope Spheeris
1998	Halloween H20: 20 Years Later	Steve Miner
1999	Lake Placid	Steve Miner
2001	Texas Rangers	Steve Miner
2001	Dr. Dolittle 2	Steve Carr
2001	Good Advice	Steve Rash
2001	Joe Somebody	John Pasquin
2003	Cradle 2 the Grave	Andrzej Bartkowiak
2004	Mean Girls	Mark Waters
2004	Paparazzi	Paul Abascal
2005	Just Like Heaven	Mark Waters
2006	Stick It	Jessica Bendinger
2007	Sex and Death 101	Daniel Waters
2008	Baby Mama	Michael McCullers
2008	Harold and Kumar Escape from Guantanamo Bay	Jon Hurwitz; Hayden Schlossberg
2009	Ghosts of Girlfriends Past	Mark Waters
2009	The Goods: Live Hard, Sell Hard	Neal Brennan
2012	American Reunion	Jon Hurwitz; Hayden Schlossberg
2014	Let's Be Cops	Luke Greenfield
2014	Dolphin Tale 2	Charles Martin Smith

Short film

Year	Title	Director	Notes
1988	Blind Curve	Gary Markowitz	
2013	The Proposition	Steve Carr	Segment of Movie 43
2015	Emma	Howard Lukk	

Documentary film

Year	Title	Director
1990	The Spirit in Architecture: John Lautner	Bette Jane Cohen
2002	Martin Lawrence Live: Runteldat	David Raynr

Direct-to-video

Year	Title	Director
1990	Punk Vacation	Stanley Lewis
1997	Céline Dion: The Concert	Bud Schaetzle

=== Television ===
TV movies

Year	Title	Director	Notes
1990	Blind Vengeance	Lee Philips	
1992	Boris and Natasha: The Movie	Charles Martin Smith	
1994	Eyes of Terror	Sam Pillsbury	
1994	Separated by Murder	Donald Wrye	
1996	A Mother's Instinct	Sam Pillsbury	With Matthew Williams
1997	Vanishing Point	Charles Robert Carner	
2009	Eva Adams	Mark Waters	

Documentary film

Year	Title	Director	Note
1995	Reba: Starting Over	Bud Schaetzle	With Chris Mosio
