= Millie De Chirico =

American film programmer

Millie De Chirico is an American film programmer.

She was the chief programmer and host of TCM Underground, a program on Turner Classic Movies.

== Biography ==
De Chirico is a graduate of Georgia State University. She is a former DJ for WRAS, the Georgia State radio station.

After De Chirico graduated from college, she got a job for TCM which included reviewing letters sent to the station by viewers.

In 2007, De Chirico started programming for TCM Underground, a program on TCM started in 2006 by Eric Weber devoted to underground film.

In 2022, De Chirico and Quatoyiah Murry published the book TCM Underground: 50 Must-See Films from the World of Classic Cult and Late-Night Cinema.

In December 2022, De Chirico was laid off from TCM. In February 2023, TCM Underground was discontinued.

De Chirico and Danielle Henderson hosted the film podcast I Saw What You Did from Nov 9, 2020 until Nov 25th, 2024.

De Chirico and former I Saw What You Did producer Casey O’Brien have hosted the film podcast Dear Movies, I Love You since January 28, 2025.
