= Mental Hygiene =

1999 book by Ken Smith

Mental Hygiene: Classroom Films 1945–1970
- Author: Ken Smith
- Language: English
- Genre: Non-fiction
- Publisher: Blast Books
- Publication date: 1999
- ISBN: 0-922233-21-7

Mental Hygiene: Classroom Films 1945–1970 is a 1999 book by former Comedy Channel writer Ken Smith, about a large genre of social guidance films on topics ranging from driver safety to dating to sexual relations and drug use.

In addition to giving a brief historical overview of educational films in the U.S., Smith devotes chapters to common themes within the works (conformity, cautionary tales, dating, menstruation, drugs, sex education, driver safety, and product placement) and to large producers such as Encyclopædia Britannica Films, Coronet Films, Centron Corporation, and independent producer Sid Davis. The last 120 pages of the book are devoted to thumbnails and synopses of 250 of the films Smith considers most notable.

The book won a 2000 Firecracker Alternative Book Award in the Special Recognition/Wildcard Category "Best Propaganda Video Guide".
