= Boys Beware =

1961 propaganda film

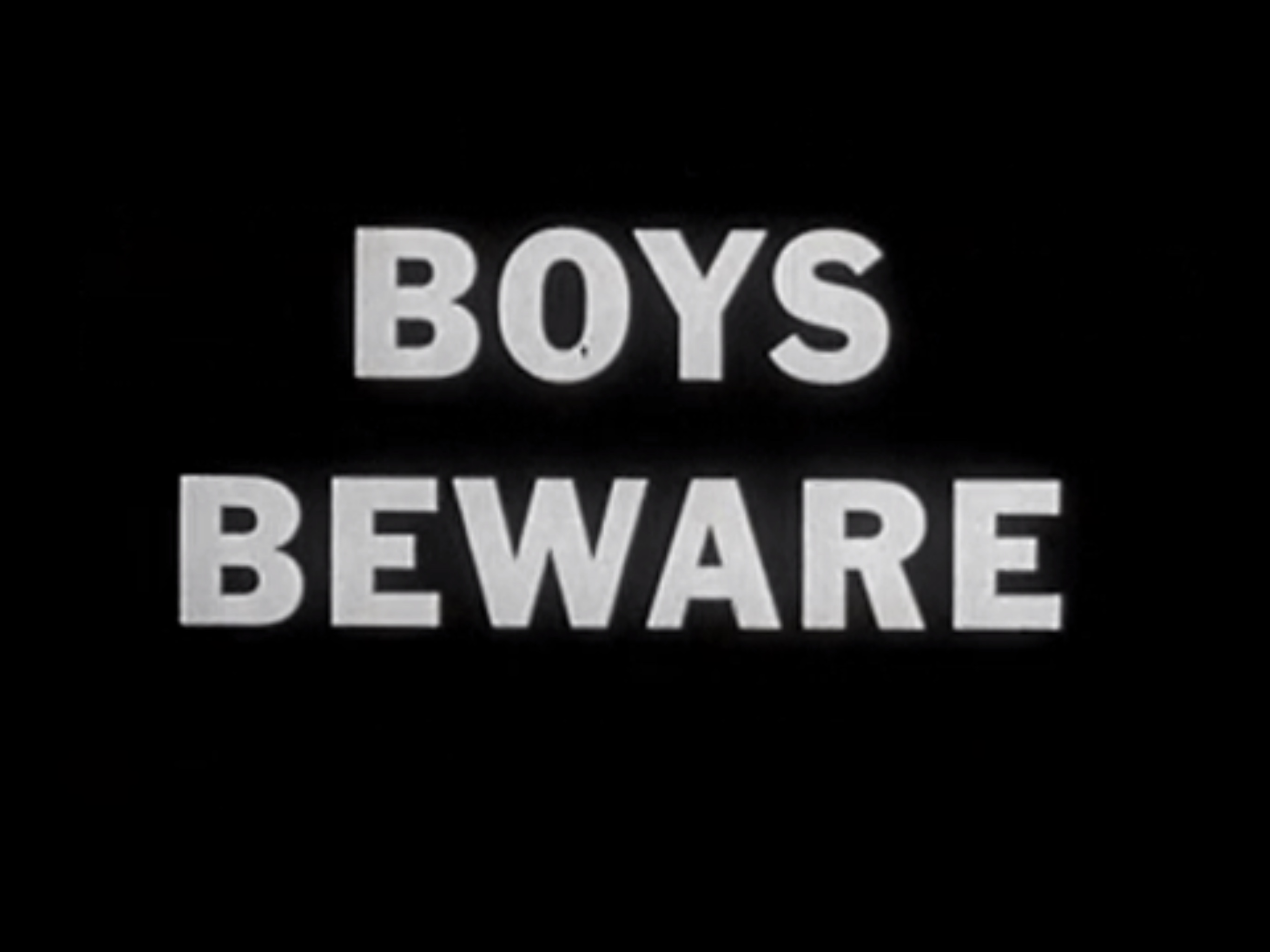
- Title card
- Directed by: Sid Davis
- Produced by: Sid Davis
- Narrated by: Timothy Farrell
- Distributed by: Sidney Davis Productions
- Release date: 1961
- Running time: 10 minutes
- Country: United States
- Language: English
- Budget: $1,000

Boys Beware is a 1961 short social guidance film released through Sid Davis Productions. It portrays several predatory male homosexuals and equates homosexuality with hebephilia and describes it as a social contagion.

== Plot ==
The film start being narrated by a police detective on his way to a school meeting to discuss the issue of sexual predators who attempt to lure adolescent males.

Teenage Jimmy Barnes was supposedly playing baseball and did not feel like walking home, so he decided to "thumb" a ride. A few moments later, a car pulls up and Jimmy enters the car of a stranger named Ralph. Jimmy and Ralph start a conversation while on the way to Jimmy's house. They arrive at his house and Jimmy gets out of Ralph's car. The following day, Ralph appears in his car waiting for him. Jimmy noticed that it was the same car and decided to ride once again. Instead of going straight to Jimmy's house, they go to a drive-in and the stranger bought him a Coke. Jimmy and Ralph hang out near a pond with ducks; both are later seen fishing on a dock. Jimmy and Ralph reveal their names when they pull out their lunch. Jimmy then eats a sandwich, while Ralph pulls out a deck of "pornographic pictures", to the curiosity of Jimmy. The narrator states that Ralph was a homosexual predator interested in young boys. Later, Jimmy is taken to a hotel with Ralph, presumably to be molested, and later reports the crime. The perpetrator is arrested; Jimmy is put on probation.

Unsuspecting boy Mike is seen playing a game of basketball with a group of friends while ignoring a man watching them. The group decides to leave, but Mike decides to stay and practice. The man then joins Mike, which Mike believes is better than playing alone. Mike then decides to leave, and the stranger offers him a ride home. Mike accepts the offer and enters the vehicle. Mike is supposedly killed that night, having "traded his life for a newspaper headline". The narrator states unlike Ralph, who was grooming Jimmy, other sexual predators could be violent and can resort to murder to cover their tracks.

Little boy Denny is tricked into entering a man's car while he and his friend sort out newspapers. The car leaves, and Denny's friend writes down the license plate number. Denny's friend is later delivering papers and talks to Denny's mother, who is seen watering her lawn and tells her of the situation and the license plate number. Denny's mother decides to go inside and call the police. Right after Denny's mother called the police, the car is quickly spotted, and the stranger is arrested.

Teenage Bobby waits in a beachside restroom where he and his friends were changing. Bobby's friends decide to head home together, while Bobby decides to take a "shortcut" under a pier (where he faces the risk of being stuck). As Bobby walks to the shortcut, he notices a man, who was seen at the restroom, following him. Bobby then waves to his friends and runs to join them believing that it is better to be with his friends than to be alone.

== Background and production ==
With a budget of $1,000 (equivalent to $10,774 in 2025), the film was shot partially in the Los Angeles suburb of Inglewood, California, and produced with the cooperation of the city's police department and the Inglewood Unified School District. Boys Beware was narrated by a police detective on his way to a school meeting to discuss the issue of sexual predators who attempt to lure adolescent males. The film equates homosexuals with child molesters and hebephiles, repeatedly describing homosexuality as a contagious mental illness. True to the stereotypes of its time, the gay men in the film have mustaches, sunglasses and/or bow ties. Davis was friendly with the police in Southern California and would accept their suggestions of topics to make films about, allowing them to guide the films' message and development.

== Later releases ==
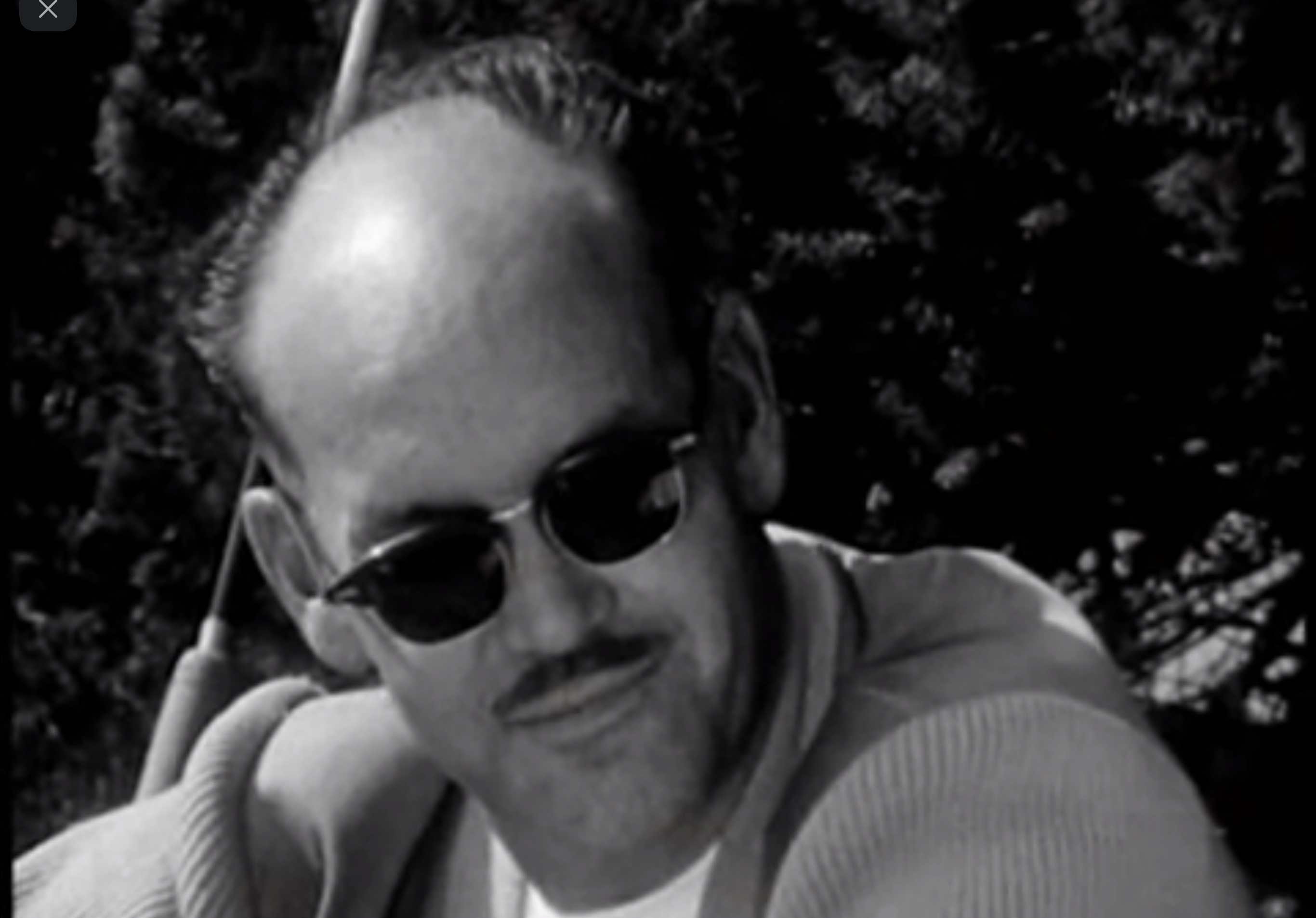
"Ralph", one of the stereotypical depictions of gay pedophiles seen in the film

A full-color version of the film was made in 1973, titled Boys Aware, using the same script and soundtrack with different actors. A third edition of the film was produced in 1979; unlike the first two installments, this version was written, edited and directed by Michael Heldman (though the closing credits acknowledged it as being "Adapted from a Sid Davis Production"). In a stark departure from its predecessors, this remake does not explicitly equate homosexuality with pedophilia, instead focusing on how the film's target audience can recognize and prevent generally dangerous situations.

== Reception ==
In 1965, Florida State Attorney Richard Gerstein recommended that high schools in Dade County, Florida, show the film to "prevent" homosexuality.

A similar film for girls called Girls Beware was produced by Sid Davis to warn girls of sexual predators from rowdy boys to grown men.

Retrospective reviews have criticized the film for conflating homosexual men with pedophiles, accusing it of homophobia. Phil Hall of Film Threat said in 2006 that Boys Beware "might be easy to laugh at [...] if the film wasn't so virulent in equating homosexuality and pedophilia," and argued that it "reinforced a culture of homophobia which is only recently being chipped away by voices of intelligence and common sense."

The same year, Margalit Fox of The New York Times said that the film was one of several of Sid Davis' films that "aged strikingly badly". Charles Ferruzza of The Pitch stated that "the situations in the film were pretty far-fetched by 1972 standards—though not as ridiculous as those in Marijuana". The Encyclopedia of LGBTQIA+ Portrayals in American Film argued that the film may have value to students as an example of "state-sponsored misinformation and homophobia propagated by earlier generations".

In 2015, a Missouri high school teacher at Raymore-Peculiar High School was suspended after showing Boys Beware to his students. He stated that he wanted to show what attitudes towards gay people had been like in previous eras.

== Film versions ==
Original film

Colorized version (1961)

1973 remake, Boys Aware

== See also ==
- List of American films of 1961
- Perversion for Profit
- List of films in the public domain in the United States
