= Punk Vacation =

1990 American action film by Stanley Lewis

- VHS cover
- Directed by: Stanley Lewis
- Written by: Lance Smith; Harvey Richelson
- Starring: Roxanne Rogers; Rob Garrison; Sandra Bogan; Don Martin; Louis Waldon
- Cinematography: Daryn Okada
- Music by: Ed Grenga; Ross Vannelli
- Production company: Windjammer Productions Inc.
- Release date: 1990
- Running time: 93 minutes
- Country: United States
- Language: English

Punk Vacation is a 1990 American action film directed by Stanley Lewis. It stars Roxanne Rogers, Rob Garrison, Sandra Bogan, Don Martin, and Louis Waldon.

== Cast ==
- Roxanne Rogers as Ramrod
- Rob Garrison as Bobby
- Sandra Bogan as Lisa
- Don Martin as Deputy Sheriff Don
- Louis Waldon as Sheriff Virgil
- Stephen Fiachi as Deputy Sheriff Reed

== Production ==
Punk Vacation was filmed around 1984 and completed in 1987.

== Critical reception ==
Brian Orndorf of Blu-ray.com wrote that Punk Vacation "is undeniably amusing, tickling in a manner only ragtag nonsense can", calling it "a clean, mean machine of goofballery with a distinct period perspective, and while a viewing requires heavy lifting in the tolerance department, the reward is a generous serving of schlock that never bores or fails to amaze with its creative limitations." Annie Choi of Bleeding Skull! wrote that the film "languishes into a mediocre-at-best revenge story with no defining insanity. There are no moments that excite, stun, amuse, or even confuse." She criticized the lack of "wild antics" from the punk characters, as well as the lack of punk music in the film, writing: "Clearly, one-time director Stanley Lewis had never seen a punk in his life."

== Home media ==
The film was released on VHS in 1990. On July 9, 2013, the film was released on DVD and Blu-ray by Vinegar Syndrome. On May 31, 2022 a limited re-release of the film on VHS was put out by Vinegar Syndrome and Lunchmeat.
