= Manfred Clynes =

Austrian-born scientist, inventor, and musician (1925–2020)

Background information
- Born: August 14, 1925; Vienna, Austria
- Died: January 19, 2020 (aged 94) West Nyack, New York, U.S.
- Occupations: scientist, inventor, concert pianist
- Years active: 1940–2020

Manfred Edward Clynes (August 14, 1925 – January 19, 2020) was an Austrian-born scientist, inventor, and musician. He is known for his innovations and discoveries in the interpretation of music, for his contributions to the study of biological systems and neurophysiology, and for coining the term cyborg with Nathan Kline.

== Overview ==
Manfred Clynes' work combines music and science, more particularly, neurophysiology and neuroscience. Clynes' musical achievements embrace performance and interpretation, exploring and clarifying the function of time forms in the expression of music—and of emotions generally—in connection with brain function in its electrical manifestations. As a concert pianist, he has recorded versions of Bach's Goldberg Variations and of Beethoven's Diabelli Variations. As an inventor, his inventions (about 40 patents) include, besides the CAT computer for electrical brain research, the online auto- and cross-correlator, and inventions in the field of ultrasound (Clynes invented color ultrasound.) as well as telemetering, data recording, and wind energy. The creative process of computer realizations of classical music with SuperConductor is based on his discoveries of fundamental principles of musicality. Clynes was the subject of a front-page article in The Wall Street Journal, September 21, 1991.

=== Emotion shapes, biologic primacy laws ===
Clynes concentrated on what he saw as the natural and unalterable interlocking of the central nervous system with basic expressive time forms, and on the innate power of those forms to generate specific basic emotions. He recognized that we are all familiar with this interlocking in our experiences of laughter and of yawning, although its scientific importance had been largely swept under the carpet by a Skinnerian bias and still largely is. According to Clynes's experimental research these time forms ("sentic forms"), as embodied in the central nervous system, are primary to the varied modes in which they find expression, such as sound, touch, and gesture. Clynes was able to prove this by systematically deriving sounds from subjects' expressions of emotions through touch, and then playing those sounds to hearers culturally remote from the original subjects. In one trial, for example, Aborigines in Central Australia were able to correctly identify the specific emotional qualities of sounds derived from the touch of white urban Americans. (This experiment was featured on Nova, What Is Music? in 1988). Clynes found in this a confirmation of the existence of biologically fixed, universal, primary dynamic forms that determine expressions of emotion that give rise to much of the experience within human societies. In 2018, he co-authored a publication with Dr Alicia Heraz in the Journal of Medical Internet Research that demonstrate similar emotional patterns on mobile phones with force sensitivity.

Some of these dynamic forms appear to be shared by those animals that have time consciousnesses at a similar rate to humans; hence the intuition of pet owners that their dog or cat understands tone of voice and the emotional form of touch. Anger, love, and grief, for example, according to Clynes, have clearly different dynamic expressive forms. Importantly, a cardinal property of this inherent biologic communication language, in Clynes' findings, is that the more closely an expression follows the precise dynamic form, the more powerful is the generation of the corresponding emotion, in both the person expressing and in the perceiver of the expression. Hence, presumably, such phenomena as charisma (in persons whose performance of emotional expressions closely follows the universal form). His experience with Pablo Casals confirmed for Clynes the importance of this faithfulness to the natural dynamic form in generating emotionally significant meaning in musical performance.

=== Sentic cycles ===
Drawing on these findings, Clynes also developed an application—a simple touch art form—in which, without music, subjects expressed, through repeated finger pressure, a sequence of emotions timed according to the natural requirements of the sentic forms. The 25-minute sequence, called the Sentic Cycle, comprises: no-emotion, anger, hate, grief, love, sexual desire, joy, and reverence. Subjects reported experiencing calmness and energy. Many also evidenced progress in the alleviation of depression, and, to some degree, tobacco and alcohol addictions, as a result of repeated application of this process. Thousands of people have by now experienced sentic cycles, some for years, some even decades. In the 1980s especially, Clynes taught various groups to conduct Sentic Cycles on their own. Nowadays, the Sentic Cycle kit is available on the Internet.

Early work developing sentic cycles in the 1970s had convinced Clynes also that it is easy with it for most people to proceed from experiencing one emotion to another quite rapidly. After three or four minutes of one emotion, a person tended to be being satiated with the current emotion. The ready switching to the next emotion with quite fresh experience pointed to the existence of specific receptors in the brain, he suggested, that become satiated with particular neurohormones; this was later confirmed by the identification of a number of such receptors. This finding links well with the historic tendency of composers to vary emotions every 4 minutes or so in their compositions. The human need for variety is based on brain receptor properties. As anyone who has seen more than three Charlie Chaplin movies in a row can testify, laughter, too, palls after prolonged exposure, and it seems to be for the same reason. Clynes also studied laughter, "nature's arrow from appearance to reality". In (nonderisive) laughter, according to Clynes, a small element of disorder is suddenly understood to be only apparently disordered, within an actual, larger, order. He then predicted the existence of soundless laughter, in which the sound production is replaced by tactile pressure at the same temporal pattern. In studies at UCSD the mean repetitions of the "ha's" was found to be approximately 5.18 per second. Clynes further hypothesized that couples with unmatched speeds of laughter might not be as readily compatible as those whose laughter was harmoniously coordinated.

Clynes enthusiastically published his realization that love, joy, and reverence were always there to be experienced, capable of being generated through precise expression and accessible by simple means, due to the connection to their biologic roots. Music had always been a special means for this, but now, with this touch artform, it was universally accessible. By this means, even negative emotions, such as grief anger, could be enjoyed in a compassionate non-destructive framework.

In the 1970s and in the 1980s Clynes had started to write poems, a few of which had found their way into his book Sentics. Later, Marvin Minsky quoted from them in his book The Society of Mind. In the late 1980s and in the 1990s he wrote his 12 Animal Poems. Boundaries of Compassion is a substantial set of poems growing out of his experience in Germany while doing experimental work at the Luedenscheid hospital in the summer of 1985, poems in regard to what Germans call "the Jewish Question."

=== Cyborg (cybernetic organism) ===
In a paper published in a 1960 issue of the journal Astronautics, Clynes and Nathan Kline coined the term cyborg, which refers to beings with both biological and artificial parts. In other words, cyborgs are beings whose abilities have been enhanced due to the presence and advancement of technology. The cyborg has become an important concept to technoself studies; an interdisciplinary domain of scholarly research dealing with all aspects of human identity in a technological society focusing on the changing nature of relationships between the human and technology.

== Biography and career ==
=== Education and influences ===
==== Early invention of inertial guidance at age 15 ====
Manfred Clynes was born on August 14, 1925, in Vienna, Austria, the son of Olga and Marcel Clynes. His family was Jewish. His parents emigrated to Melbourne, in September 1938 to escape Nazism. In Australia, at fifteen, in his last year at high school, having newly learned calculus, he invented the inertial guidance method for aircraft using piezoelectric crystals and repeated electronic integration, but Australian authorities denied that it would work. In fact, the same system Clynes had invented was later used with great success, during the last part of the Second World War. The detailed descriptions of this invention as written by the fifteen-year-old Clynes are rigorous; it was the first of his many inventions to come that worked. (Clynes' earlier attempt, at the age of thirteen, to create a perpetual motion device was naturally a failure). In 1946 Clynes graduated from the University of Melbourne having studied both engineering science and music.

Around this time he also had lessons with the Polish virtuoso Ignaz Friedman, then resident in Sydney. Having seen Friedman play in concert several times, Clynes approached him by letter and was accepted sight unseen. He hitchhiked from Melbourne as he could not afford the train fare, let alone the fee charged by Friedman. His musical talent was recognized by a series of awards, concerto performances and prizes, one of which provided a three-year graduate fellowship to the Juilliard School. At Juilliard, he was a piano student of Olga Samaroff and Sascha Gorodnitzki.

He received his MS degree from Juilliard in 1949, after having performed Beethoven's Piano Concerto No. 1 at the Tanglewood Music Festival (in 1948) then under the direction of Serge Koussevitzky in a performance that the pianist Gerson Yessin, who was present, recently recalled as "monumental." [Yessin: "Manfred played beautifully, outstandingly"]. After graduating from Juilliard (It gave no doctorates then), Clynes retreated to a small log cabin at six thousand feet altitude in the solitude of Wrightwood, California. There he learned Bach's Goldberg Variations and other works. He performed them for the first time in October 1949, in Ojai, at Jiddu Krishnamurti's school, and, in 1950, along with other works, in all the capital cities of Australia, to great acclaim. He soon became regarded as one of Australia's outstanding pianists.

In 1952 he was invited to Princeton University as a graduate student in the music department, and issued a green card, to pursue his studies in the Psychology of Music, with a Fulbright and Smith-Mundt Award. There he became aware of the work of G. Becking, who in 1928 had published a sensitive, if nonscientific, study of distinctive motor patterns associated in following the music of individual composers. It was this work that led, in the late 1960s, to Clynes' scientific sentographic studies of what he termed composers' pulses, as their motor manifestation, in which Pablo Casals and Rudolf Serkin were to be his first subjects.

Young Clynes had a personal letter of introduction to Albert Einstein from an elderly lady in Australia, with whom, in her youth, Einstein had exchanged poems. Soon Einstein invited him repeatedly to dinner at his home, and a friendship sprang up between the two men. Clynes played music on his fine Bechstein piano for Einstein, especially Beethoven, Mozart and Schubert. He loved Clynes' playing of Mozart and Schubert, calling Clynes "a blessed artist" ("Ein begnadeter Künstler"). In May 1953 Einstein wrote Clynes a personal letter by hand to help him in his forthcoming European tour.

Letter from Einstein

(Translation of Einstein's letter, dated Princeton, May 18, 1953: "Dear Mr. Clynes, I am truly grateful to you for the great enjoyment that your piano playing has given me. Your performance combines a clear insight into the inner structure of the work of art with a rare spontaneity and freshness of conception. With all the secure mastery of your instrument, your technique never supplants the artistic content, as unfortunately so often is the case in our time. I am convinced that you will find the appreciation to which your achievement entitles you. With friendly greetings yours, A. Einstein.")

==== Concert tours in 1953 Goldberg Variations ====
In 1953, helped by the letter from Einstein, Clynes toured Europe with great critical success, playing the Goldberg Variations. The tour ended with a solo concert before an audience of 2500 at London's Royal Festival Hall, which had just been built.

=== Inventions and scientific discoveries ===
In 1954, to provide for his parents and to raise funds necessary to underwrite his musical career, Clynes, on the basis of his scientific training, took a job working with a new analog computer, a device about which, at the time, both he and his interviewer were ignorant. In short order, however, Clynes mastered that computer, and then within a year created a new analytic method of stabilizing dynamical systems, which he published as a paper in the IEEE Transactions. Bogue, the company he was working for, doubled his salary, after a year, unasked. "Only in America!" was Clynes' reaction. (He became a citizen in 1960.)

In 1955, at Clynes' suggestion, Bogue employed his father, then aged 72, from Australia, as a naval architect; the elder Clynes had not been permitted to work in his profession in Australia, because he was not British-born. For a time Clynes father and son went to work together every morning (to Clynes' rejoicing).

As the result of a chance meeting, in 1956, Dr Nathan S. Kline, Director of the Research Center of Rockland State Hospital, a large mental hospital, offered Clynes a substantial research job at the Center, where he in 1956 became 'Chief Research Scientist'. Kline was to become the recipient of two Lasker Awards, and had built up that research center to formidable renown. (It is now called the Nathan S. Kline Psychiatric Center.)

==== CAT computer ====
An autodidact in physiology, Clynes applied dynamic systems analysis to the homeostatic and other control processes of the body so successfully in the next three years, that he received a series of awards, including, for the best paper published in 1960 – Clynes' annus mirabilis (miracle year) – the IRE W.R.G. Baker Award (1961). In 1960 he invented the CAT computer (Computer of Average Transients) a $10,000 portable computer permitting the extraction of responses from ongoing electric activity—the needle in the haystack. The CAT quickly came into use in research labs all over the world, marketed by Technical Measurements Corp., advancing the study of the electric activity of the brain (enabling, for example, the clinical detection of deafness in newborns). In this way, Clynes made his fortune by age 37.

==== URS law ====
Also in 1960, he discovered a biologic law, "Unidirectional Rate Sensitivity," the subject, in 1967, of a two-day symposium held by the New York Academy of Science. This law, related to biologic communication channels of control and information, is basically the consequence of the fact, realized by Clynes, that molecules can only arrive in positive numbers, unlike engineering electric signals, which can be positive or negative. This fact imposes radical limitations on the methods of control that biology can use. It cannot, for example, simply cancel a signal by sending a signal of opposite polarity, since there is no simple opposite polarity. To cancel, a second channel involving other, different molecules (chemicals) is required. This law explains, among other things, why the sensations of hot and cold need to operate through two separate sensing channels in the body, why we do not actively sense the disappearance of a smell, and why we continue to feel shocked after a near-miss accident.

1967 NY Times article on Clynes

Also in 1960, in collaboration with Nathan S. Kline, Clynes published the cyborg concept, and its corollary, participant evolution. "Cyborg" became a household word and was misapplied, much to the dismay of Clynes, in films such as Terminator. Cyborgology is now a field taught at numerous universities. In 1964 the University of Melbourne awarded Clynes the degree of D.Sc, a degree superior to PhD and rarely given by British universities.

=== Towards synthesis of scientific and musical work ===
1960 NY Times article on Clynes

Already in 1960 The New York Times had noted Clynes' remarkable double-stranded gifts. In 1965 he began to offer concerts at his newly acquired home on the Hudson, which had a real pipe organ in the living room, and 5 acres (2.0 ha) of land. With the financial stability resulting from his scientific discoveries, it became possible for Clynes to return to music. An ardent admirer of the great master musician Pablo Casals since early childhood, Clynes now attended all Casals' master classes, many with his family.

In 1966, Clynes played both the Diabelli Variations of Beethoven and Bach's Goldberg Variations for Casals, and was invited to join Casals in Puerto Rico for several months to take part in his music and to accompany some of the master classes at the Casals home in Santurce. Clynes considered this contact with Casals to be a fulfilment of his most cherished lifelong dream. Casals exceeded his expectations in every way, and Clynes considered his friendship with Casals to have been the highpoint of his life. As no one else, Casals had, by Clynes' estimation an immediate contact with the profound in music. After his return to New York City, Clynes performed Beethoven's Fourth Piano Concerto and also gave several concerts at his mansion for invited audiences that included Erich Fromm.

==== Color and the brain ====
With his new CAT computer, Clynes studied the relation of color processing in the brain and the dynamics to sound, and, jointly with M.Kohn, to color of the pupil of the eye. He showed that brain electrical responses to the color red from previous black produced similar patterns from several distinct brain sites, for all subjects. Other colors produced their own distinct patterns. These results from 1965 went a long way to help dispel the Skinnerian notion of tabula rasa. By 1968 he was able to show that it was possible to distinguish which of 100 different objects a person was looking at from his electrical brain responses alone, with repeated presentations. In other experiments in 1969 he described what he called the R-M function (from Rest to Motion) detectable at the apex of the brain for various modalities of stimulation, showing how two sets of unidirectionally rate sensitive (URS) channels in series could produce an effect corresponding to the mental concepts Rest and Motion. What could three URS channel sets do in combination? He never found out. But here were the beginnings of the embodiments of mental concepts in a wordless manner—a way of representing intuitive concepts to the brain wordlessly.

=== The brain as an output device ===
His work until around 1967 had been concerned with the brain as an input device i.e. for perception; now he began to study it as an output device. He turned first to the question of the characteristic pulse in the music of various composers, which had been on his mind since his Princeton years. In 1967 Clynes designed an instrument he called the sentograph to measure the motoric pulse. The experiments required outstanding musicians to "conduct" music on a pressure-sensitive finger rest, as they were thinking the music without sound. Rudolf Serkin and Pablo Casals were his first subjects. Soon it became apparent that the 'pulse shapes' for Beethoven, Mozart, Schubert, and Mendelssohn were consistently different from each another, but similar across their different pieces (when normalized according to selection of similar tempo). Encouraged by these positive findings relating outputs to specific inner states of the brain, first presented at a Smithsonian Conference in 1968 at Santa Inez, Clynes then proceeded to measure the expressive form of specific emotions in a similar way, by having subjects generate them by repeatedly expressing them on the finger rest, thus finding specific signatures for the emotions, which he called sentic forms. As in the case of composers' pulses, the form associated with each emotion consistently appeared for that emotion and was distinct from the forms of other emotions.

In 1972 Clynes, whose work had long been supported by NIH Grants, received a grant from the Wenner Gren Foundation in Sweden, allowing him to collect data in Central Mexico, Japan, and Bali, using the sentograph to investigate emotional expression cross-culturally. Though considerably more limited in scope than the nature of that inquiry would demand, the data were largely confirmatory of Clynes' theories of universal biologically determined time forms for each emotion. At the invitation of the NY Academy of Sciences, Clynes wrote an extensive monograph on his findings and theories to date, which the Academy published in 1973.

That same year he accepted a visiting professorship in the music department of the University of California at San Diego, where he completed his book Sentics, the Touch of Emotion, which he had begun in 1972. In it he summarized the theories and findings on sentics, and outlined hopes for the future that his work contained. In 1970 and 1971, the American Association for the Advancement of Science held two symposia on Sentics.

Since the sentic cycles suddenly helped individuals feel better without drugs, Clynes' work was now deemed contrary to the line of research sponsored at the Rockland State Research Center, headed by Nathan Kline, whose supporters were the major drug companies. As a result, Clynes was unable to continue the work at that facility. In his new environment, there was no laboratory in which to amass new data. Although dismissed by The New York Times, Sentics was lauded extravagantly in other publications. (The book is considered a classic today). It was read in manuscript with great approval and excitement by several authorities: Yehudi Menuhin volunteered a foreword, itself a remarkable document, welcoming Clynes "as a brother." Rex Hobcroft, the director of the New South Wales State Conservatory in Sydney, the foremost musical institution in Australia, compared it to Beethoven's Opus 111, the last of Beethoven's sonatas and held to be his most profound work. (Hobcroft's endorsement appears on the jacket.) Maharishi Mahesh Yogi's resident psychiatrist, Dr. H. Bloomfield joined in.

During his three years at UCSD, in La Jolla, Clynes gave a concert at Brubecker Hall, playing the Beethoven Diabelli Variations, as well as a first performance of a group of five songs he composed, called "Sentone Songs," employing the remarkable vocal range of Linda Vickerman who performed them. The songs, in his own avant garde style, contained many varied syllables but no known words of any language.

He did studies of laughter at the brain Institute of UCLA at that time, unsuccessfully attempting to measure the electric counterpart in the brain of the moment that initiates laughter. He was the first to discover, in studying voice recognition in 1975 that a speaker's identity, though unimpeded by changes in speed (tempo), was masked by transposition of as little as a semitone in pitch. This seemed to indicate that perfect pitch was involved far more universally than thought possible. He began work on a book on laughter, which, however, was only two-thirds completed.

In 1977 Rex Hobcroft, director of Sydney's New South Wales State Conservatory, who had praised Clynes' Sentics, offered Clynes a substantial position at the Conservatory initially connected with the International Piano Competition held at the time in Sydney. Accordingly, Clynes moved to Sydney in what proved to be the beginning of ten fruitful years of research and music making. In 1978 Clynes gave performances of both the Goldberg Variations and the Diabelli, as well as works of Mozart, at the Verbruggen Hall in Sydney. These performances were recorded live and are today regarded as unsurpassed. From a concertizing point of view, there were unusual difficulties: Clynes' two big-city performances had not been preceded by the usual shake-down cruise of smaller venues: Clynes had only one chance to get it right—and did.

Hobcroft and the government of New South Wales provided Clynes with a Music Research Center and staff at the Conservatory for his work, supplied be the state of NSW Ministry of Education. The staff were mostly enthusiasts of Clynes' work from the United States.

==== Predictive amplitude shaping in music ====
The following year 1980, at the occasion of the 10th International Congress on Acoustics in Sydney, Clynes and his staff presented no fewer than four papers. With the aid of his new DEC PDP 23 computer and associated oscillator gear, he discovered the principle of Predictive Amplitude Shaping (a precise rule for how the shaping of each note is influenced by what note is next and when it will occur) applicable to music in general, a result he presented at an international conference in Stockholm at their invitation.

Encouraged by the enthusiastic reception of this work in Stockholm, Clynes, on his return to Sydney, now made the major leap to discern how a composer's unique pulse is manifest in each note. It had been known (Leopold Mozart, C.P.E. Bach) that in the work of many composers of the "classic" period, a group of, say, four notes, when notated equally, were not meant to be played equally. The leap was in treating the four durations and loudnesses not as separate entities, but as a group, an interconnected organism, a 'face' in which each component played a unique role, but all combined to form a gestalt. To find this gestalt, and how it worked organically in the music, he intuited a specific combined amplitude and timing "warp," so that each such group has a configuration—a gestalt—that is characteristic of the particular composer. (Now there was also a link to the motoric pulse, previously identified, which had contained no information about single notes but gave a motoric identity to the output of the brain in conducting music of a particular composer).

The identification of composers' pulse, and its use in interpreting classical works via computer, was later extended by Clynes, according to his knowledge and experience with dynamic forms, to comprise several levels of time structure.

Shortly after this, in 1983–84 Clynes, with the programming help of N. Nettheim, found a method of allowing computers to design vibrato suitable for each note, depending on the musical structure, also sometimes anticipating next events.

Further, all these principles could be easily generically adjusted for the requirements of each musical piece. Of course, a work's interpretation was not robotically created: the computer needed to get adjustments to correspond to the concept of the interpreter. The computer did not replace the human sensitivity, it empowered it instead.

When Clynes' longtime close friend and supporter Hephzibah Menuhin had launched his book Sentics in 1978 in Australia, small symptoms of her developing throat cancer had made their first appearance. Ms. Menuhin died in 1981, and Clynes gave a memorial concert for her in the Verbruggen Hall, of the last three sonatas of Beethoven, Op 109, 110, and 111. He had learned Beethoven's Opus 110 especially for that occasion, never having performed it before. Intensive practice resulted in his losing an exquisite living place in Vaucluse and his subsequent relocation to an apartment in Point Piper, an adjacent suburb in Sydney.

In 1982, Clynes undertook further extensive studies on the nature of the expression of emotions through touch. Subjects were touched on the palm of the hand, from behind a screen, with specific emotional expressions, to discover whether they could identify the emotion. In fact, they could. Clynes and Walker extended this work in a research trip to central Australia, to the Yuendumu Reservation, to test if Aborigines would recognize emotions expressed by touch of white urban dwellers when transformed into sounds that conserved the dynamic shape of the touch.

The test was highly positive: the Aborigines did in fact successfully identify the emotions expressed by the touch, of white urban subjects, from which were produced (through a simple transformation, preserving the dynamic shape) the sounds they heard. The American television program Nova reenacted this experiment in 1986, effectively linking the expression of emotions through touch to musical expression, using Beethoven's Eroica Funeral March to exemplify grief, and a Haydn sonata for joy.

In 1986, Clynes gave his (or anyone's) first classical concert played entirely by computer, according to the three principles he had discovered, to a full house in a free concert at the Joseph Post Hall of the Sydney Conservatory. As a result of the application of those principles, the music, ranging from Bach to Beethoven to Robert Schumann and Felix Mendelssohn was musically expressive and meaningful, even though all sounds, except for the piano, were produced by computer-controlled oscillators, and so did not represent familiar instruments—the real time expressive modification of the canonical orchestral sounds remained elusive until 1993.

In 1986, the Fairlight Company, a maker of top-of-the-line synthesizers in the hundred thousand dollar range, immediately opted to license what they called "the best sequencer in the world." Clynes, at that time, did not even know what a sequencer was. Fairlight started paying royalties on the patent; however, not long afterwards, the company went bankrupt, having lost government subsidies through a change of government, before bringing the product to market.

Reaching retirement age in Sydney, Clynes left to be professorial associate in the psychology department at Melbourne University and became Sugden Fellow at Queen's College, which he had attended as an undergraduate.

He stayed for three years. During that time he found an analytic equation for an egg, incorporating fractals, which also provided, with some modification of the equation, beautiful shapes of flowers and of vases. He also performed as pianist, in a Sunday series at Queens College, twelve of the Beethoven sonatas, lecturing to the Physics Department on Time (starting with a poem beginning, "What time is it?") and to the Medical Faculty on the biologic nature of dynamic expressive forms.

==== Composers' pulses ====
Also during this period, Clynes undertook a large statistical study with various groups of the perception of composer's pulse. In the study, Clynes played four different pieces by computer, by each of four different composers (sixteen in all), with what his studies had determined to be the composer's own pulse and three times the same with a 'wrong' composer's pulse, to see which one subjects actually preferred. There were four groups of subjects: internationally well-known pianists, Juilliard graduate students, students at the Manhattan School of Music, and college students at the University of Melbourne, altogether some 150 subjects. The results, published in the journal Cognition, showed that the "correct" pulse was preferred in all groups; more pronouncedly so the higher the musical standing of the subjects. (Among the 'famous pianist subjects' were friends of Clynes, Vladimir Ashkenazy and Paul Badura-Skoda.)

Clynes returned to the United States in 1991 and settled in Sonoma, California. Not long after his return he was featured in a large front-page article of The Wall Street Journal, an outgrowth of his invitation to a Canadian meeting on music. This highly favorable article opened many doors. Two vice presidents from Hewlett Packard flew separately to Clynes' home to learn about his findings. When they arrived, Clynes played versions of the same Mozart sonata K 330 by six famous artists, including Vladimir Horowitz, Alicia de Larrocha, Claudio Arrau, and Mitsuko Uchida, and included the computer performance at a random position among them. The visitors from HP not only could not identify the computer version, but they rated it second best of the seven. (MIDI versions were considered too musically crude to be included).

As a result, Clynes received a development contract that would for the first time enable the expressive implementation of real instrumental sounds other than the piano, using a workstation made available to him by HP, a $40,000 computer, which was, at 150 MHz, barely fast enough to do this. Clynes enlisted his gifted son Darius as software engineer on the HP team to help make it possible. Nine months later, a critical demonstration took place to show that the principles Clynes had discovered would work well with real instruments, not just with oscillators, to enable music played with meaningful phrasing and expression. Clynes and the assembled HP researchers first heard the sound of flute, violin, and cello from the HP workstation performing a Haydn trio expressively in real time over the loudspeakers of the vast halls of the HP Research Building. The inanities of MIDI had been conquered.

Once Clynes had successfully developed a real-time implementation of his principles for musical interpretation via computer, using UNIX, HP gave Clynes' company, Microsound, Intl, a second development contract to bring this capacity into the burgeoning world of personal computers (PCs), which, in 1994, functioned at 60 MHz. A French division of HP, then in charge of PC development, supported this enthusiastically. Clynes was fortunate to obtain the help of Steve Sweet, a programmer, to carry out the conversion. However, soon thereafter, HP transferred the PC work to a new division in the United States whose director favored popular music.

==== SuperConductor ====
Henceforth, with the help of Steve Sweet, Clynes developed the software program, called SuperConductor himself. By 1996 they had a fully working version, incorporating all the new principles, with which they interpreted, first, all the Brandenburg Concertos of Bach, and then all of Bach's solo violin and cello works and the last six quartets of Beethoven. All these works were recorded on CDs.

Clynes further expanded SuperConductor's capacity for real life expressive interpretation of music with a fourth principle he called "Self-tuning Expressive Intonation," which unfixes the equal temperament tuning and permits the sharpening of the leading tone and other modifications of the sort executed by fine players of stringed instruments and other instruments whose intonation is actively controlled in the playing; now even a piano could exhibit this technique—by means of a laptop computer and synthesizer. Since it is a melodic tuning, depending on intervals, no transposition was required. The same interval going up received a different small pitch increment from that interval going down. Moreover, similarly to known use in tones like the leading tone, Clynes found it appropriate to provide quite small, specific increments to all melodic intervals, 24 in all (twelve up and twelve different ones down). A new patent [US 6,924,426] was granted in 2006. This now made it possible for all computers and synthesizers to benefit from expressive intonation, a non-static, dynamic tuning, in which the same note has a slightly different pitch depending on the melodic structure (the demise of equal temperament).

After a four-year absence in Thailand, Steve Sweet returned to Sonoma and resumed his development work with Clynes, incorporating the new functionality into SuperConductor II. (ref to mp3s on the webpage of SuperConductor)

With SuperConductor, Clynes performed Beethoven's Emperor Concerto at MIT's Kresge Auditorium in 1999 to the astonishment and wonder and thunderous applause of over two thousand people. In 2006, using Self-tuning Expressive Intonation, he performed the Schubert Unfinished Symphony and Beethoven's Eroica Symphony at the University of Vienna in the Kleine Konzertsaal.

In 2007, at the age of 82, Clynes has developed new exercises for piano playing away from the piano, which may permit the improvement of piano technique even for octogenarians. In 2007 he applied for three new patents related to SuperConductor, to enhance computer interpretation of music, through: (1) increased mathematical subtlety of note shaping and resulting timbre variations, as earlier, dependent on musical structure, resulting in (2) 'instant rehearseless conducting', and (3) importation of note-specific vibrato and shaping from SuperConductor into MIDI files. [patent numbers when available]

== Marriage, Divorce, and Death ==
Clynes married in 1951, divorced in 1972 and has three children and eight grandchildren. He died in West Nyack, New York in January 2020, at the age of 94.
