= Nathan S. Kline =

American physician (1916–1983)

- Born: Nathan Schellenberg Kline; March 22, 1916; Philadelphia, Pennsylvania, U.S.
- Died: February 11, 1983 (aged 66); New York City, U.S.
- Education: Swarthmore College
- Known for: Psychology; Psychopharmacology
- Awards: Lasker Award
- Website: Nathan Kline Institute

Nathan Schellenberg Kline, M.D. (March 22, 1916 – February 11, 1983) was an American scientist, researcher in the field of psychology and psychiatrist best known for his work with psychopharmacologic drugs. Having been influential in the development of the very first antipsychotic and antidepressant medications in the 1950s, Kline is often regarded as the "father of psychopharmacology."

== Research ==
A graduate of the New York University School of Medicine, he and Robert Edward Gross are the only two-time winners of the Albert Lasker Award for Clinical Medical Research, an award sometimes referred to as "America's Nobel Prize". Kline was best known for his pioneering work with psychopharmacologic drugs. In 1952, he started a research unit at Rockland State Hospital, NY (later the Rockland Psychiatric Center). At that time, the national inpatient population in public hospitals was approaching the half-million mark. Traditional therapies seemed inadequate to treat the growing number of mentally ill patients.

Kline and his colleagues took the unusual step of investigating reserpine, a derivative of Rauvolfia serpentina. Rauvolfia was commonly used in India to treat many physical complaints, and reserpine was being used in the US to treat high blood pressure. For two years, trials with hospitalized patients found that approximately 70% of those with schizophrenia were markedly relieved from their symptoms. This work earned Kline, along with his colleagues, his first Lasker Award.

Encouraged by his success with this tranquilizer, Kline investigated the properties of antidepressants. Within a year, patients in psychiatric centers throughout the US were receiving antidepressant medication. In 1964, Kline earned his second Lasker Award for the study of the introduction and use of iproniazid, a monoamine oxidase inhibitor, in the treatment of severe depression. This successful use of drugs for two major categories of psychiatric illness led to the release of thousands who were able to rejoin society. Kline's work has been acknowledged as a major factor in opening a new era in psychiatry: psychopharmacology.

During the 1960s the Rockland Research Institute grew to more than 300 staff. Kline's reputation drew biomedical researchers from around the world. Many laboratory techniques were developed to determine the therapeutic doses of frequently used medications, doses which are safe yet effective, at the Rockland Research Institute.

Kline was founder and director of the International Committee Against Mental Illness. As an advisor to several international health agencies such as the World Health Organization and CARE-Medco, Kline was aware of the lack of medical treatment for mental illnesses in developing countries. He traveled widely and devoted much time to establishing and visiting mental health clinics and programs in other parts of the world.

== Writing ==
In 1960, Kline and Manfred Clynes coined the term cyborg, using it in an article in Astronautics Magazine about the advantages of self-regulating human-machine systems in outer space. Along a similar vein, Kline believed that computers could be used in large scale epidemiological studies and streamline the administration of complex health facilities. In 1968 he oversaw the installation of a major computer center at Rockland, funded by the Federal government. He led the development of many computerized medical systems, which led to improvements in patient care.

He wrote a great deal, authoring nearly 500 scientific publications, magazine and newspaper articles for the general public, and a book, "From Sad to Glad". He made frequent appearances as a guest on radio and television shows in his attempt to educate the public about mental illness and research. Upon his death in 1983, the Rockland Research Institute was renamed the Nathan Kline Institute for Psychiatric Research, part of the New York State Office of Mental Health.

== See also ==
- Psychopharmacology
- Psychiatric medication
- Psychiatry
- Mental health
- Nathan Kline Institute for Psychiatric Research
- Cyborg
