= The Terrible Truth =

1951 film

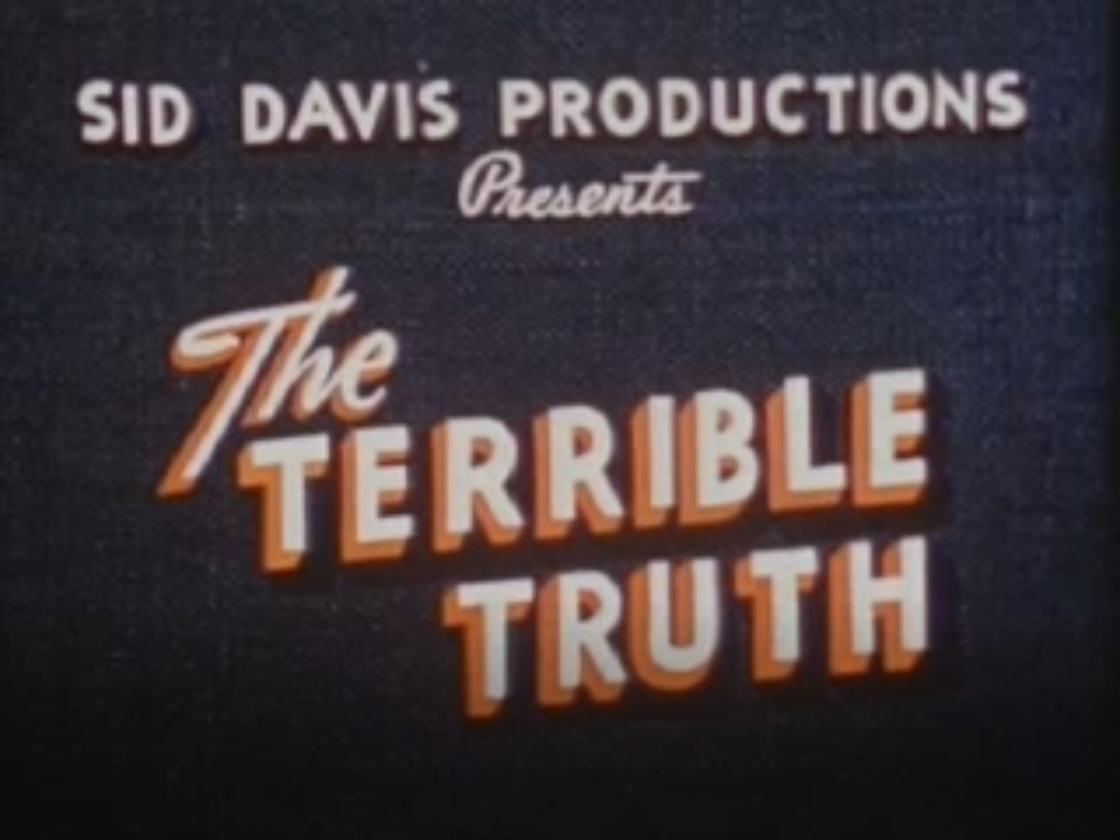
- Title card
- Produced by: Sid Davis
- Starring: William B. McKesson
- Production company: Sid Davis Productions
- Distributed by: Sidney Davis Productions
- Release date: 1951
- Running time: 10 minutes
- Country: United States
- Language: English

The Terrible Truth is a 1951 American anti-drug documentary film created by Sid Davis Productions.

== Summary ==
The film contained messages such as "marijuana has similar properties to amphetamines" and "the Soviet Union was pushing drugs in America". The film follows William B. McKesson (to become Los Angeles County District Attorney in 1956) who interviews a young woman about her use of marijuana as a gateway drug to intravenous use of heroin. McKesson states at the end of the film "Some say that the Reds are promoting drug traffic in the United States to undermine national morale."

== Reception and legacy ==
The film has been called "faux documentary ... ironic, naïve, campy", and according to Edward Brunner in Postmodern Culture, one of the "scandalous examples of how thoroughly the media environment has been penetrated by schemes for social engineering". It can be found alongside famously bad movies like Reefer Madness on popular film lists, for example those found at thefix.com as one of the five worst anti-drug works of the past century, and The Atlantic where it is described as "hysterical" and "cartoonish".

The film is included in the Prelinger Archives, a scholarly collection of film related to U.S. history.
