= A Day in the Death of Donny B =

Day in the Death of Donny B, A
- Directed by: Carl Fick
- Written by: Carl Fick
- Produced by: Louis Mucciolo
- Starring: Carl Fick
- Cinematography: Harold L. Grier
- Edited by: Dennis Blakeley; Harold Phox
- Music by: Harry Holt
- Production company: Audio Productions
- Distributed by: U.S. Office of Education, Department of Health, Education and Welfare
- Release date: 1969
- Running time: 14 mins
- Language: English

A Day in the Death of Donny B is a 1969 American short docudrama written and directed by Carl Fick and shot in cinéma-vérité style. Mostly considered an anti-drug film, it was made for the Substance Abuse and Mental Health Services Administration. The film follows its protagonist, Donny B, a young black man who appears to be a heroin addict, as he makes his way through the cruel ghettos of New York City. He tries to score money for his next fix by stealing hubcaps, purse-snatching, panhandling, and engaging in street gambling.

The short film's soundtrack mostly consists of voice-overs of his parents despairing over his future, former addicts describing the junkie lifestyle, and cops informing the audience of the consequences of illegal drug use and addiction. Through the run time of 14 minutes, a blues-like tune written and performed by Harry Holt plays over the footage and voice-overs, with vocals that come in and out during the film, narrating Donny B as he does wrong.

== Cast ==
- Donny B. as himself

== DVD release ==
Film preservation company Terpsichore Collection Inc. was reportedly in talks to restore the film for a special edition DVD which would contain other important or rare short films. On April 25, 2007, a preview was released on Terpsichore's website. It shows little of a restoration, although it does confirm the making of the DVD.

It is in the public domain.

== See also ==
- List of American films of 1969
