= Eyeborg =

Body modification apparatus

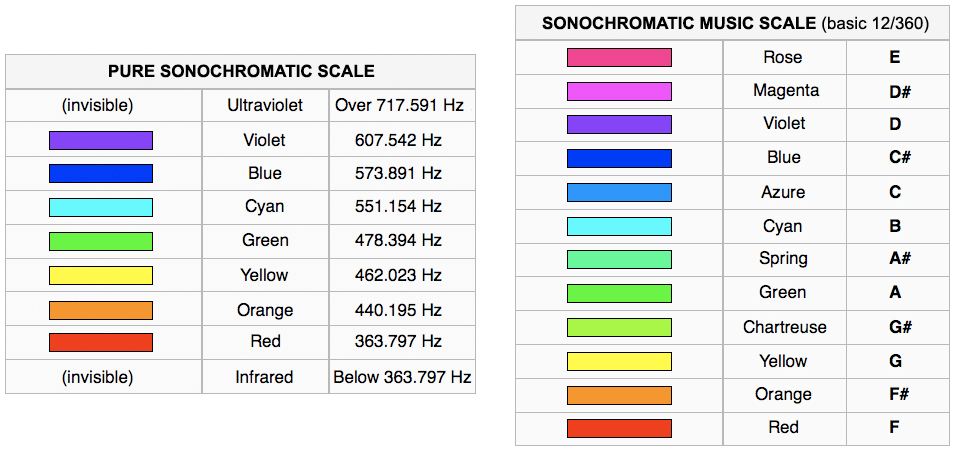
The Harbisson's Sonochromatic Music Scale

An eyeborg or eye-borg is a body modification apparatus which fits on the wearer's head, and is designed to allow people to perceive color through sound waves. It works with a head-mounted antenna that senses the colors directly in front of a person, and converts them in real-time into sound waves through bone conduction.

== History ==
The first eyeborg was created in England in 2003 by Adam Montandon in collaboration with colourblind artist Neil Harbisson. The invention, under the heading Bridging the Island of the Colourblind Project, won a British award in Innovation (Submerge 2004) and a European award in Content Tools and Interface Design (Europrix 2004). In 2007, Peter Kese, a software developer from Kranj, Slovenia, made further developments to the eyeborg by increasing the number of color hues to 360 and adding color saturation through different volume levels. In 2009, Matias Lizana, a student from Universitat Politècnica de Catalunya developed the eyeborg into a chip as part of his final year project. The chip allows users to have the device implanted and to hear colors beyond the limits of human perception such as infrared and ultraviolet.

== Color to sound scales ==
Harbisson's Sonochromatic Music Scale (2003) is a microtonal and logarithmic scale with 360 notes in an octave. Each note corresponds to a specific degree of the color wheel. The scale was introduced to the first eyeborg in 2004.

Harbisson's Pure Sonochromatic Scale (2005) is a non-logarithmic scale based on the transposition of light frequencies to sound frequencies. The scale discards color as being part of a color wheel and ignores musical/logarithmic perception so it can overstep the limits of human perception. The introduction of the new scale to the eyeborg in 2010, allows users to decide whether they want to perceive colors logarithmically or not.

== The blind ==
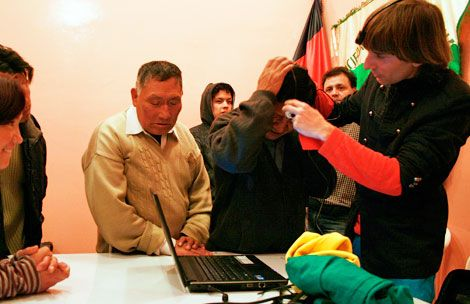
Blind Ecuadorians using eyeborgs

Since 2005, eyeborgs have been donated to blind communities in Europe, Asia and America with the aim of helping the blind develop the sense of color. The first blind person to try out an eyeborg was Sabriye Tenberken followed by blind students from Braille Without Borders in Tibet and members of the Sociedad de Ciegos de Pichincha in Ecuador.

In 2011, vice-president of Ecuador Lenin Moreno announced that his government would collaborate with the Cyborg Foundation to create eyeborgs and new sensory extensions. In 2012, after lecturing at Escola Politécnica de Pernambuco in Recife, the Cyborg Foundation signed a partnership to create eyeborgs and other new human extensions in collaboration with Universidade de Pernambuco in Brazil.

Eyeborgs are currently being treated as body parts rather than as devices, and therefore are donated rather than sold.

== See also ==
- Synesthesia
- Neuroprosthetics
