= Cyborg =

Being with both organic and biomechatronic body parts

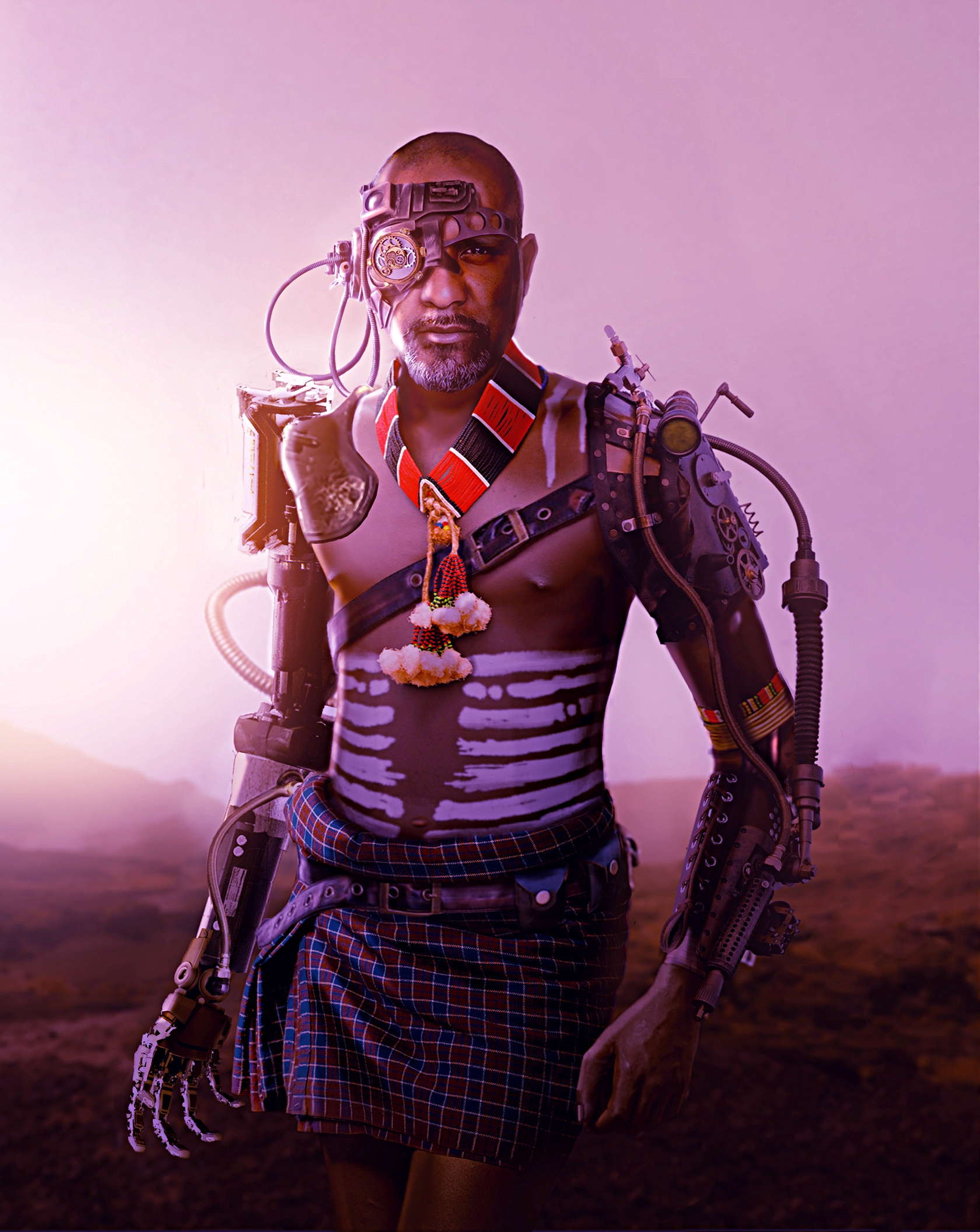
Artist's illustration of a cyborg

A cyborg (/ˈsaɪbɔːrɡ/) is a being with both organic and biomechatronic body parts. It is a portmanteau of cybernetic and organism. The term was coined in 1960 by Manfred Clynes and Nathan S. Kline. In contrast to biorobots and androids, the term cyborg applies to a living organism that has undergone restoration of function or enhancements of abilities due to the integration of some artificial component or technology that relies on feedback.

== Description and definition ==
Alternative names for a cyborg include cybernetic organism, cyber-organism, cyber-organic being, cybernetically enhanced organism, cybernetically augmented organism, technorganic being, techno-organic being, and techno-organism.

Unlike bionics, biorobotics, or androids, a cyborg is an organism that has restored function or, especially, enhanced abilities due to the integration of some artificial component or technology that relies on some sort of feedback, for example: prostheses, artificial organs, implants or, in some cases, wearable technology. Cyborg technologies may enable or support collective intelligence. A related idea is the "augmented human". While cyborgs are commonly thought of as mammals, including humans, the term can apply to any organism.

=== Placement and distinctions ===
D. S. Halacy's Cyborg: Evolution of the Superman (1965) featured an introduction which spoke of a "new frontier" that was "not merely space, but more profoundly the relationship between 'inner space' to 'outer space' – a bridge...between mind and matter."

In "A Cyborg Manifesto", Donna Haraway rejects the notion of rigid boundaries between humanity and technology, arguing that, as humans depend on more technology over time, humanity and technology have become too interwoven to draw lines between them. She believes that since we have allowed and created machines and technology to be so advanced, there should be no reason to fear what we have created, and cyborgs should be embraced because they are part of human identities. However, Haraway has also expressed concern over the contradictions of scientific objectivity and the ethics of technological evolution, and has argued that "There are political consequences to scientific accounts of the world."

=== Biosocial definition ===
According to some definitions of the term, the physical attachments that humans have with even the most basic technologies have already made them cyborgs. In a typical example, a human with an artificial cardiac pacemaker or implantable cardioverter-defibrillator would be considered a cyborg, since these devices measure voltage potentials in the body, perform signal processing, and can deliver electrical stimuli, using a synthetic feedback mechanism to keep that person alive. Implants, especially cochlear implants, that combine mechanical modification with any kind of feedback response are also cybernetic enhancements. Some theorists cite such modifications as contact lenses, hearing aids, smartphones, or intraocular lenses as examples of fitting humans with technology to enhance their biological capabilities.

The emerging trend of implanting microchips inside the body (mainly the hands), to make financial operations like a contactless payment, or basic tasks like opening a door, has been erroneously marketed as more recent examples of cybernetic enhancement. The latter has not yet seen significant traction outside niche areas in Scandinavia and in actual function is little more than a pre-programmed Radio-frequency identification (RFID) microchip encased in glass that does not interact with the human body (it is the same technology used in the microchips injected into animals for ease of identification), thus not fitting the definition of a cybernetic implant.

As cyborgs currently are on the rise, some theorists argue there is a need to develop new definitions of aging. For instance, a bio-techno-social definition of aging has been suggested.

The term is also used to address human-technology mixtures in the abstract. This includes not only commonly used pieces of technology such as phones, computers, the Internet, and so on, but also artifacts that are not usually considered technology; for example, pen and paper, and speech and language. When augmented with these technologies and connected in communication with people in other times and places, a person becomes capable of more than they were before. An example is a computer, which gains power by using Internet protocols to connect with other computers. Another example is a social-media bot—either a bot-assisted human or a human-assisted-bot—used to target social media with likes and shares. Cybernetic technologies thus include highways, pipes, electrical wiring, buildings, electrical plants, libraries, and other infrastructural constructs.

Bruce Sterling, in his Shaper/Mechanist universe, suggested an idea of an alternative cyborg called 'Lobster', which is made not by using internal implants, but by using an external shell (e.g. a powered exoskeleton). The computer game Deus Ex: Invisible War prominently features cyborgs called Omar, Russian for 'lobster'.

=== Evolutionary perspective ===
In 1994, Hans Hass formulated a scientific view of the human-machine hybrids he called "hypercells". They can expand their biological cell body with artificial artifacts and thus expand their performance body. The theory of hypercells or Homo proteus, as Hass called the human-machine hybrid to distinguish Homo sapiens, extends Charles Darwin's theory of evolution and deals with the course of evolution beyond humans.

In his 2019 book Novacene, James Lovelock used the term "cyborgs" to refer to the next generation of beings who will become the "understanders of the future" and "lead the cosmos to self-knowledge". While acknowledging the organic component in Clynes' and Kline's definition, he proposed that these cyborgs "will have designed and built themselves from the artificial intelligence systems we have already constructed", and used the term cyborg "to emphasize that the new intelligent beings will have arisen, like us, from Darwinian evolution."

== Origins ==
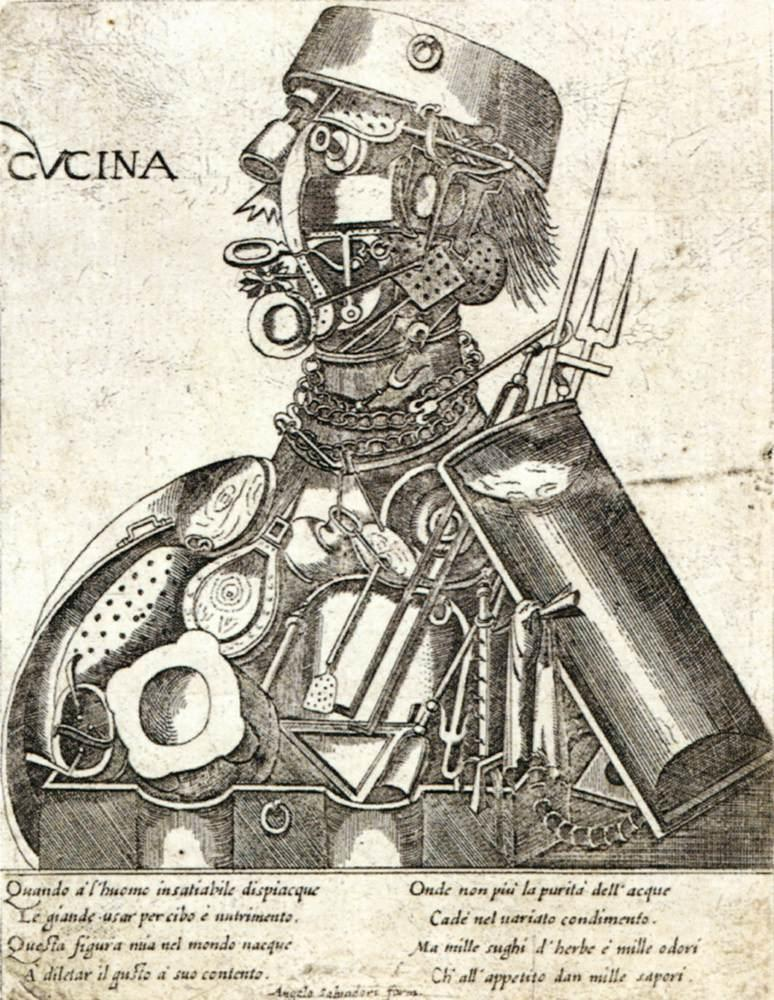
Engraving by an unknown author depicting a man-machine hybrid, 1569

The concept of a man-machine mixture was widespread in science fiction before World War II. As early as 1843, Edgar Allan Poe described a man with extensive prostheses in the short story "The Man That Was Used Up". In 1911, Jean de La Hire introduced the Nyctalope, a science fiction hero who was perhaps the first literary cyborg, in Le Mystère des XV (later translated as The Nyctalope on Mars). Nearly two decades later, Edmond Hamilton presented space explorers with a mixture of organic and machine parts in his 1928 novel The Comet Doom. He later featured the talking, living brain of an old scientist, Simon Wright, floating in a transparent case, and in all the adventures of his famous hero, Captain Future. In 1944, in the short story "No Woman Born", C. L. Moore wrote of Deirdre, a dancer, whose body was burned completely and whose brain was placed in a faceless but beautiful and supple mechanical body.

In 1960, the term cyborg was coined by Manfred E. Clynes and Nathan S. Kline to refer to their conception of an enhanced human being who could survive in extraterrestrial environments:

For the exogenously extended organizational complex functioning as an integrated homeostatic system unconsciously, we propose the term 'Cyborg'.

Their concept was the outcome of thinking about the need for an intimate relationship between human and machine as the new frontier of space exploration was beginning to develop. A designer of physiological instrumentation and electronic data-processing systems, Clynes was the chief research scientist in the Dynamic Simulation Laboratory at Rockland State Hospital in New York.

The term first appeared in print in May 1960 when The New York Times reported on a paper to be delivered by Clynes and Kline at the "Psychophysiological Aspects of Space Flight Symposium" of the Air Force School of Aviation Medicine coordinated by the Southwest Research Institute:

A cyborg is essentially a man-machine system in which the control mechanisms of the human portion are modified externally by drugs or regulatory devices so that the being can live in an environment different from the normal one.

The paper, "Drugs, Space and Cybernetics," was published in October 1960 by the journal Astronautics.

Thereafter, Hamilton would first use the term cyborg explicitly in the 1962 short story, "After a Judgment Day", to describe the "mechanical analogs" called "Charlies," explaining that "[c]yborgs, they had been called from the first one in the 1960s...cybernetic organisms."

The 1972 novel Cyborg by Martin Caidin introduced the character of bionic government agent Steve Austin, and was adapted into the popular television series The Six Million Dollar Man, which ran from 1973 to 1978.

In 2001, a book titled Cyborg: Digital Destiny and Human Possibility in the Age of the Wearable computer was published by Doubleday. Some of the ideas in the book were incorporated into the documentary film Cyberman that same year.

== Cyborg tissues in engineering ==
Cyborg tissues structured with carbon nanotubes and plant or fungal cells have been used in artificial tissue engineering to produce new materials for mechanical and electrical uses.

Such work was presented by Raffaele Di Giacomo, Bruno Maresca, and others, at the Materials Research Society's spring conference on 3 April 2013. The cyborg obtained was inexpensive, light and had unique mechanical properties. It could also be shaped in the desired forms. Cells combined with multi-walled carbon nanotubes (MWCNTs) co-precipitated as a specific aggregate of cells and nanotubes that formed a viscous material. Likewise, dried cells still acted as a stable matrix for the MWCNT network. When observed by optical microscopy, the material resembled an artificial "tissue" composed of highly packed cells. The effect of cell drying was manifested by their "ghost cell" appearance. A rather specific physical interaction between MWCNTs and cells was observed by electron microscopy, suggesting that the cell wall (the outermost part of fungal and plant cells) may play a major active role in establishing a carbon nanotube's network and its stabilization. This novel material can be used in a wide range of electronic applications, from heating to sensing. For instance, using Candida albicans cells, a species of yeast that often lives inside the human gastrointestinal tract, cyborg tissue materials with temperature sensing properties have been reported.

== Actual cyborgization attempts ==
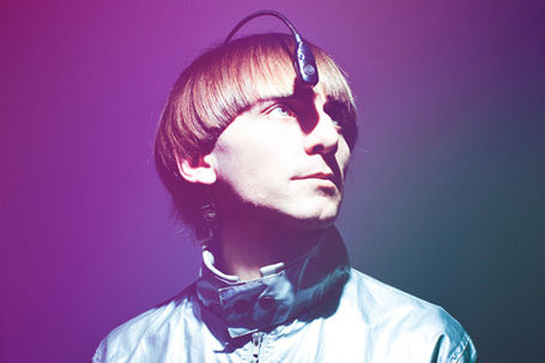
Cyborg Neil Harbisson with his antenna implant

In current prosthetic applications, the C-Leg system developed by Otto Bock HealthCare, is used to replace a human leg that has been amputated because of injury or illness. The use of sensors in the artificial C-Leg aids in walking significantly by attempting to replicate the user's natural gait, as it would be prior to amputation. A similar system is being developed by the Swedish orthopedic company Integrum, the OPRA Implant System, which is surgically anchored and integrated by means of osseointegration into the skeleton of the remainder of the amputated limb. The same company has developed e-OPRA, a will-powered upper limb prosthesis system that is being evaluated in a clinical trial to allow sensory input to the central nervous system using pressure and temperature sensors in the prosthesis' finger tips. Prostheses like the C-Leg, the e-OPRA Implant System, and the iLimb, are considered by some to be the first real steps towards the next generation of real-world cyborg applications. Additionally, cochlear implants and magnetic implants, which provide people with a sense that they would not otherwise have had, can additionally be thought of as creating cyborgs.

In vision science, direct brain implants have been used to treat non-congenital (acquired) blindness. One of the first scientists to come up with a working brain interface to restore sight was private researcher William Dobelle. Dobelle's first prototype was implanted into "Jerry", a man blinded in adulthood, in 1978. A single-array BCI containing 68 electrodes was implanted onto Jerry's visual cortex and succeeded in producing phosphenes, the sensation of seeing light. The system included cameras mounted on glasses to send signals to the implant. Initially, the implant allowed Jerry to see shades of grey in a limited field of vision at a low frame-rate. This also required him to be hooked up to a two-ton mainframe, but shrinking electronics and faster computers made his artificial eye more portable and now enable him to perform simple tasks unassisted.

In 1997, Philip Kennedy, a scientist and physician, created the world's first human cyborg from Johnny Ray, a Vietnam War veteran who suffered a stroke. Ray's body, as doctors called it, was "locked in". Ray wanted his old life back so he agreed to Kennedy's experiment. Kennedy embedded an implant he designed (and named a "neurotrophic electrode") near the injured part of Ray's brain so that Ray would be able to have some movement back in his body. The surgery went successfully, but in 2002, Ray died.

In 2002, Canadian Jens Naumann, also blinded in adulthood, became the first in a series of 16 paying patients to receive Dobelle's second-generation implant, marking one of the earliest commercial uses of BCIs. The second-generation device used a more sophisticated implant enabling better mapping of phosphenes into coherent vision. Phosphenes are spread out across the visual field in what researchers call the starry-night effect. Immediately after his implant, Naumann was able to use his imperfectly restored vision to drive slowly around the parking area of the research institute.

In contrast to replacement technologies, in 2002, under the heading Project Cyborg, a British scientist, Kevin Warwick, had an array of 100 electrodes fired into his nervous system to link his nervous system into the internet to investigate enhancement possibilities. With this in place, Warwick successfully carried out a series of experiments including extending his nervous system over the internet to control a robotic hand, also receiving feedback from the fingertips to control the hand's grip. This was a form of extended sensory input. Subsequently, he investigated ultrasonic input to remotely detect the distance to objects. Finally, with electrodes also implanted into his wife's nervous system, they conducted the first direct electronic communication experiment between the nervous systems of two humans.

Since 2004, British artist Neil Harbisson has had a cyborg antenna implanted in his head that allows him to extend his perception of colors beyond the human visual spectrum through vibrations in his skull. His antenna was included within his 2004 passport photograph which has been said to confirm his cyborg status. In 2012 at TEDGlobal, Harbisson explained that he started to feel like a cyborg when he noticed that the software and his brain had united and given him an extra sense. Harbisson is a co-founder of the Cyborg Foundation (2004) and cofounded the Transpecies Society in 2017, which is an association that empowers individuals with non-human identities and supports them in their decisions to develop unique senses and new organs. Neil Harbisson is a global advocate for the rights of cyborgs.

Rob Spence, a Toronto-based filmmaker, who titles himself a real-life "Eyeborg", severely damaged his right eye in a shooting accident on his grandfather's farm as a child. Many years later, in 2005, he decided to have his ever-deteriorating and now technically blind eye surgically removed, whereafter he wore an eyepatch for some time before he later, after having played for some time with the idea of installing a camera instead, contacted professor Steve Mann at the Massachusetts Institute of Technology, an expert in wearable computing and cyborg technology.

Under Mann's guidance, Spence, at age 36, created a prototype in the form of the miniature camera which could be fitted inside his prosthetic eye; an invention that would come to be named by Time magazine as one of the best inventions of 2009. The bionic eye records everything he sees and contains a 1.5 mm^{2}, low-resolution video camera, a small round printed circuit board, a wireless video transmitter, which allows him to transmit what he is seeing in real-time to a computer, and a 3-volt rechargeable VARTA microbattery. The eye is not connected to his brain and has not restored his sense of vision. Additionally, Spence has also installed a laser-like LED light in one version of the prototype.

Furthermore, many people with multifunctional radio frequency identification (RFID) microchips injected into a hand are known to exist. With the chips they are able to swipe cards, open or unlock doors, operate devices such as printers or, with some using cryptocurrency, buy products, such as drinks, with a wave of the hand.

=== bodyNET ===
bodyNET is an application of human-electronic interaction currently in development by researchers from Stanford University. The technology is based on stretchable semiconductor materials (Elastronic). According to their article in Nature, the technology is composed of smart devices, screens, and a network of sensors that can be implanted into the body, woven into the skin or worn as clothes. It has been suggested that this platform can potentially replace the smartphone in the future.

== Practical applications ==
=== In medicine and biotechnology ===
In medicine, there are two important and different types of cyborgs: the restorative and the enhanced. Restorative technologies "restore lost function, organs, and limbs." The key aspect of restorative cyborgization is the repair of broken or missing processes to revert to a healthy or average level of function. There is no enhancement to the original faculties and processes that were lost.

On the contrary, the enhanced cyborg "follows a principle, and it is the principle of optimal performance: maximising output (the information or modifications obtained) and minimising input (the energy expended in the process)". Thus, the enhanced cyborg intends to exceed normal processes or even gain new functions that were not originally present.

==== Prosthetics ====
Although prostheses in general supplement lost or damaged body parts with the integration of a mechanical artifice, bionic implants in medicine allow model organs or body parts to mimic the original function more closely. Michael Chorost wrote a memoir of his experience with cochlear implants, or bionic ears, titled Rebuilt: How Becoming Part Computer Made Me More Human. Jesse Sullivan became one of the first people to operate a fully robotic limb through a nerve-muscle graft, enabling him a complex range of motions beyond that of previous prosthetics. By 2004, a fully functioning artificial heart was developed. The continued technological development of bionic and (bio-)nanotechnologies begins to raise the question of enhancement, and of the future possibilities for cyborgs which surpass the original functionality of the biological model. The ethics and desirability of "enhancement prosthetics" have been debated; their proponents include the transhumanist movement, with its belief that new technologies can assist the human race in developing beyond its present, normative limitations such as aging and disease, as well as other, more general inabilities, such as limitations on speed, strength, endurance, and intelligence. Opponents of the concept describe what they believe to be biases which propel the development and acceptance of such technologies; namely, a bias towards functionality and efficiency that may compel assent to a view of human people which de-emphasizes as defining characteristics actual manifestations of humanity and personhood, in favor of definition in terms of upgrades, versions, and utility.

Retinal implants are another form of cyborgization in medicine. The theory behind retinal stimulation to restore vision for those suffering from retinitis pigmentosa and vision loss due to aging (conditions in which people have an abnormally low number of retinal ganglion cells), is that the retinal implant and electrical stimulation would act as a substitute for the missing ganglion cells (cells which connect the eye to the brain).

While the work to perfect this technology is still being done, there have already been major advances in the use of electronic stimulation of the retina to allow the eye to sense patterns of light. A specialized camera is worn by the subject, such as on the frames of their glasses, which converts the image into a pattern of electrical stimulation. A chip located in the user's eye would then electrically stimulate the retina with this pattern by exciting certain nerve endings which transmit the image to the optic centers of the brain, and the image would then appear to the user. If technological advances proceed as planned, this technology may be used by thousands of blind people and restore vision to most of them.

A similar process has been created to aid people who have lost their vocal cords. This experimental device would do away with previously used robotic-sounding voice simulators. The transmission of sound would start with a surgery to redirect the nerve that controls the voice and sound production to a muscle in the neck, where a nearby sensor would be able to pick up its electrical signals. The signals would then move to a processor which would control the timing and pitch of a voice simulator. That simulator would then vibrate producing a multi-tonal sound that could be shaped into words by the mouth.

An article published in Nature Materials in 2012 reported research on "cyborg tissues" (engineered human tissues with embedded three-dimensional mesh of nanoscale wires), with possible medical implications.

In 2014, researchers from the University of Illinois Urbana-Champaign and Washington University in St. Louis had developed a device that could keep a heart beating endlessly. By using 3D printing and computer modeling, these scientists developed an electronic membrane that could successfully replace pacemakers. The device uses a "spider-web like network of sensors and electrodes" to monitor and maintain a normal heart rate with electrical stimuli. Unlike traditional pacemakers that are similar from patient to patient, the elastic heart glove is made custom by using high-resolution imaging technology. The first prototype was created to fit a rabbit's heart, operating the organ in an oxygen and nutrient-rich solution. The stretchable material and circuits of the apparatus were first constructed by Professor John A. Rogers in which the electrodes are arranged in an s-shape design to allow them to expand and bend without breaking. Although the device is only currently used as a research tool to study changes in heart rate, in the future the membrane may serve as a safeguard against heart attacks.

==== Neural enhancement and restoration ====
A brain–computer interface, or BCI, provides a direct path of communication from the brain to an external device, effectively creating a cyborg. Research into invasive BCIs, which use electrodes implanted directly into the grey matter of the brain, has focused on restoring damaged eyesight in the blind and providing functionality to paralyzed people, most notably those with severe cases, such as locked-in syndrome. This technology could enable people who are missing a limb or are in a wheelchair the power to control the devices that aid them through neural signals sent from the brain implants directly to computers or the devices. It is possible that this technology will also eventually be used with healthy people.

Deep brain stimulation is a neurological surgical procedure used for therapeutic purposes. This process has aided in treating patients diagnosed with Parkinson's disease, Alzheimer's disease, Tourette syndrome, epilepsy, chronic headaches, and mental disorders. After the patient is unconscious, through anesthesia, brain pacemakers or electrodes, are implanted into the region of the brain where the cause of the disease is present. The region of the brain is then stimulated by bursts of electric current to disrupt the oncoming surge of seizures. Like all invasive procedures, deep brain stimulation may put the patient at a higher risk. However, there have been more improvements in recent years with deep brain stimulation than any available drug treatment.

==== Pharmacology ====
Automated insulin delivery systems, colloquially also known as the "artificial pancreas", are a substitute for the lack of natural insulin production by the body, most notably in Type 1 Diabetes. Currently available systems combine a continuous glucose monitor with an insulin pump that can be remote controlled, forming a control loop that automatically adjusts the insulin dosage depending on the current blood glucose level. Examples of commercial systems that implement such a control loop are the MiniMed 670G from Medtronic and the t:slim x2 from Tandem Diabetes Care. Do-it-yourself artificial pancreas technologies also exist, though these are not verified or approved by any regulatory agency. Upcoming next-generation artificial pancreas technologies include automatic glucagon infusion in addition to insulin, to help prevent hypoglycemia and improve efficiency. One example of such a bi-hormonal system is the Beta Bionics iLet.

=== In the military ===
Military organizations' research has recently focused on the use of cyborg animals for the purposes of a supposed tactical advantage. DARPA has announced its interest in developing "cyborg insects" to transmit data from sensors implanted into the insect during the pupa stage. The insect's motion would be controlled from a microelectromechanical system (MEMS) and could conceivably survey an environment or detect explosives and gas. Similarly, DARPA is developing a neural implant to remotely control the movement of sharks. The shark's unique senses would then be exploited to provide data feedback in relation to enemy ship movement or underwater explosives.

In 2006, researchers at Cornell University invented a new surgical procedure to implant artificial structures into insects during their metamorphic development. The first insect cyborgs, moths with integrated electronics in their thorax, were demonstrated by the same researchers. The initial success of the techniques has resulted in increased research and the creation of a program called Hybrid-Insect-MEMS (HI-MEMS). Its goal, according to DARPA's Microsystems Technology Office, is to develop "tightly coupled machine-insect interfaces by placing micro-mechanical systems inside the insects during the early stages of metamorphosis."

The use of neural implants has recently been attempted, with success, on cockroaches. Surgically applied electrodes were put on the insect, which was remotely controlled by a human. The results, although sometimes different, basically showed that the cockroach could be controlled by the impulses it received through the electrodes. DARPA is now funding this research because of its obvious beneficial applications to the military and other areas

In 2009 at the Institute of Electrical and Electronics Engineers (IEEE) MEMS conference in Italy, researchers demonstrated the first "wireless" flying-beetle cyborg. Engineers at the University of California, Berkeley, have pioneered the design of a "remote-controlled beetle", funded by the DARPA HI-MEMS Program. This was followed later that year by the demonstration of wireless control of a "lift-assisted" moth-cyborg.

Eventually researchers plan to develop HI-MEMS for dragonflies, bees, rats, and pigeons. For the HI-MEMS cybernetic bug to be considered a success, it must fly 100 metres (330 ft) from a starting point, guided via computer into a controlled landing within 5 metres (16 ft) of a specific end point. Once landed, the cybernetic bug must remain in place.

In 2020, an article published in Science Robotics by researchers at the University of Washington reported a mechanically steerable wireless camera attached to beetles. Miniature cameras weighing 248 mg were attached to live beetles of the Tenebrionid genera Asbolus and Eleodes. The camera wirelessly streamed video to a smartphone via Bluetooth for up to 6 hours and the user could remotely steer the camera to achieve a bug's-eye view.

=== In sports ===
In 2016, Cybathlon became the first cyborg 'Olympics'; celebrated in Zurich, Switzerland, it was the first worldwide and official celebration of cyborg sports. In this event, 16 teams of people with disabilities used technological developments to turn themselves into cyborg athletes. There were 6 different events and its competitors used and controlled advanced technologies such as powered prosthetic legs and arms, robotic exoskeletons, bikes, and motorized wheelchairs.

This was already a remarkable improvement, as it allowed disabled people to compete and showed the several technological enhancements that are already making a difference; however, it showed that there is still a long way to go. For instance, the exoskeleton race still required its participants to stand up from a chair and sit down, navigate a slalom and other simple activities such as walking over stepping stones and climbing up and down stairs. Despite the simplicity of these activities, 8 of the 16 teams that participated in the event drop off before the start.

Nonetheless, one of the main goals of this event and such simple activities is to show how technological enhancements and advanced prosthetics can make a difference in people's lives. The next Cybathlon that was expected to occur in 2020, was cancelled due to the coronavirus pandemic.

=== In art ===
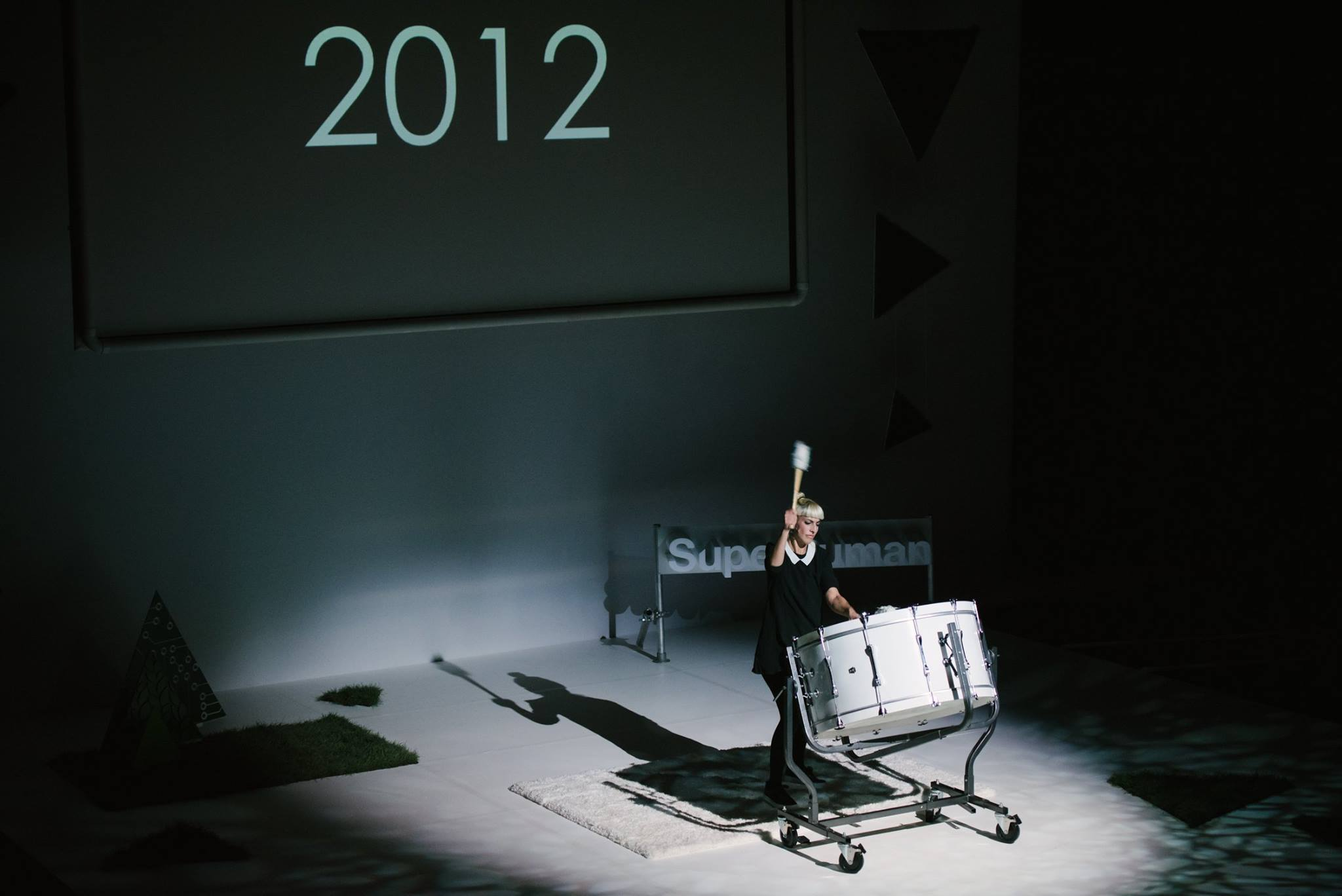
Cyborg artist Moon Ribas, founder of the Cyborg Foundation performing with her seismic sense implant at TED (2016)

The concept of the cyborg is often associated with science fiction. However, many artists have incorporated and reappropriated the idea of cybernetic organisms into their work, using disparate aesthetics and often realising actual cyborg constructs; their works range from performances, to paintings and installations. Some of the pioneering artists who created such works are H. R. Giger, Stelarc, Orlan, Shu Lea Cheang, Lee Bul, Tim Hawkinson, Steve Mann, Patricia Piccinini. More recently, this type of artistic practice has been expanded upon by artists such as Marco Donnarumma, Wafaa Bilal, Neil Harbisson, Moon Ribas, Manel De Aguas and Quimera Rosa.

Stelarc is a performance artist who has visually probed and acoustically amplified his body. He uses medical instruments, prosthetics, robotics, virtual reality systems, the Internet and biotechnology to explore alternate, intimate and involuntary interfaces with the body. He has made three films of the inside of his body and has performed with a third hand and a virtual arm. Between 1976 and 1988 he completed 25 body suspension performances with hooks into the skin. For 'Third Ear', he surgically constructed an extra ear within his arm that was internet-enabled, making it a publicly accessible acoustical organ for people in other places. He is presently performing as his avatar from his second life site.

Tim Hawkinson promotes the idea that bodies and machines are coming together as one, where human features are combined with technology to create the Cyborg. Hawkinson's piece Emoter presented how society is now dependent on technology.

Marco Donnarumma is a performance artist and new media artist. In his work the body becomes a morphing language to speak critically of ritual, power and technology. For his "7 Configurations" cycle, between 2014 and 2019, he engineered and created six AI prostheses, each embodying an uncanny configuration of the machinic with the organic. The prostheses – designed together with a team of artists and scientists – are useless prostheses, paradoxical objects designed for the body, but not to enhance it, rather to subtract functions from it: a skin-cutting robot with a steel metal knife, a facial prosthesis which blocks the wearer's gaze with a mechanical arm, and two robotic spines that function as additional limbs without a body. The prostheses have been created to act as performers with their own agency, that is, to interact with their human partners without being controlled externally. The machines are embedded with biomimetic neural networks, information processing algorithms inspired by the biological nervous system of mammals. Developed by Donnarumma in collaboration with the Neurorobotics Research Laboratory (DE), these neural networks endow the machines with artificial cognitive and sensorimotor skills.

Wafaa Bilal is an Iraqi-American performance artist who had a small 10-megapixel digital camera surgically implanted into the back of his head, part of a project entitled 3rd I. For one year, beginning 15 December 2010, an image was captured once per minute 24 hours a day and streamed live to www.3rdi.me and the Mathaf: Arab Museum of Modern Art. The site also displays Bilal's location via GPS. Bilal says that the reason why he put the camera in the back of the head was to make an "allegorical statement about the things we don't see and leave behind." As a professor at NYU, this project raised privacy issues, and so Bilal was asked to ensure that his camera did not take photographs in NYU buildings.

Machines are becoming more ubiquitous in the artistic process itself, with computerized drawing pads replacing pen and paper, and drum machines becoming nearly as popular as human drummers. Composers such as Brian Eno have developed and used software that can build entire musical scores from a few basic mathematical parameters.

Scott Draves is a generative artist whose work is explicitly described as a "cyborg mind". His Electric Sheep project generates abstract art by combining the work of many computers and people over the internet.

==== Artists as cyborgs ====
Artists have explored the term cyborg from a perspective involving imagination. Some work to make an abstract idea of technological and human-bodily union apparent to reality in an art form using varying mediums, from sculptures and drawings to digital renderings. Artists who seek to make cyborg-based fantasies a reality often call themselves cyborg artists, or may consider their artwork "cyborg". How an artist or their work may be considered cyborg will vary depending upon the interpreter's flexibility with the term.

Scholars that rely upon a strict, technical description of a cyborg, often going by Norbert Wiener's cybernetic theory and Manfred E. Clynes and Nathan S. Kline's first use of the term, would likely argue that most cyborg artists do not qualify to be considered cyborgs. Scholars considering a more flexible description of cyborgs may argue it incorporates more than cybernetics. Others may speak of defining subcategories, or specialized cyborg types, that qualify different levels of cyborg at which technology influences an individual. This may range from technological instruments being external, temporary, and removable to being fully integrated and permanent. Nonetheless, cyborg artists are artists. Being so, it can be expected for them to incorporate the cyborg idea rather than a strict, technical representation of the term, seeing how their work will sometimes revolve around other purposes outside of cyborgism.

=== In body modification ===
As medical technology becomes more advanced, some techniques and innovations are adopted by the body modification community. While not yet cyborgs in the strict definition of Manfred Clynes and Nathan Kline, technological developments like implantable silicon silk electronics, augmented reality and QR codes are bridging the disconnect between technology and the body. Hypothetical technologies such as digital tattoo interfaces would blend body modification aesthetics with interactivity and functionality, bringing a transhumanist way of life into present day reality.

In addition, it is quite plausible for anxiety expression to manifest. Individuals may experience pre-implantation feelings of fear and nervousness. To this end, individuals may also embody feelings of uneasiness, particularly in a socialized setting, due to their post-operative, technologically augmented bodies, and mutual unfamiliarity with the mechanical insertion. Anxieties may be linked to notions of otherness or a cyborged identity.

=== In space ===
Sending humans to space is a dangerous task in which the implementation of various cyborg technologies could be used in the future for risk mitigation. Stephen Hawking, a renowned physicist, stated "Life on Earth is at the ever-increasing risk of being wiped out by a disaster such as sudden global warming, nuclear war ... I think the human race has no future if it doesn't go into space." The difficulties associated with space travel could mean it might be centuries before humans ever become a multi-planet species. There are many effects of spaceflight on the human body. One major issue of space exploration is the biological need for oxygen. If this necessity was taken out of the equation, space exploration would be revolutionized. A theory proposed by Manfred E. Clynes and Nathan S. Kline is aimed at tackling this problem. The two scientists theorized that the use of an inverse fuel cell that is "capable of reducing CO2 to its components with the removal of the carbon and re-circulation of the oxygen ..." could make breathing unnecessary. Another prominent issue is radiation exposure. Yearly, the average human on earth is exposed to approximately 0.30 rem of radiation, while an astronaut aboard the International Space Station for 90 days is exposed to 9 rem. To tackle the issue, Clynes and Kline theorized a cyborg containing a sensor that would detect radiation levels and a Rose osmotic pump "which would automatically inject protective pharmaceuticals in appropriate doses." Experiments injecting these protective pharmaceuticals into monkeys have shown positive results in increasing radiation resistance.

Although the effects of spaceflight on our bodies are an important issue, the advancement of propulsion technology is just as important. With our current technology, it would take us about 260 days to get to Mars. A study backed by NASA proposes an interesting way to tackle this issue through deep sleep, or torpor. With this technique, it would "reduce astronauts' metabolic functions with existing medical procedures." So far experiments have only resulted in patients being in torpor state for one week. Advancements to allow for longer states of deep sleep would lower the cost of the trip to Mars as a result of reduced astronaut resource consumption.

=== In cognitive science ===
Theorists such as Andy Clark suggest that interactions between humans and technology result in the creation of a cyborg system. In this model, cyborg is defined as a part-biological, part-mechanical system that results in the augmentation of the biological component and the creation of a more complex whole. Clark argues that this broadened definition is necessary to an understanding of human cognition. He suggests that any tool which is used to offload part of a cognitive process may be considered the mechanical component of a cyborg system. Examples of this human and technology cyborg system can be very low tech and simplistic, such as using a calculator to perform basic mathematical operations or pen and paper to make notes, or as high tech as using a personal computer or phone. According to Clark, these interactions between a person and a form of technology integrate that technology into the cognitive process in a way that is analogous to the way that a technology that would fit the traditional concept of cyborg augmentation becomes integrated with its biological host. Because all humans in some way use technology to augment their cognitive processes, Clark comes to the conclusion that we are "natural-born cyborgs." Professor Donna Haraway also theorizes that people, metaphorically or literally, have been cyborgs since the late twentieth century. If one considers the mind and body as one, much of humanity is aided with technology in almost every way, which hybridizes humans with technology.

== Future scope and regulation of implantable technologies ==
Given the technical scope of current and future implantable sensory/telemetric devices, such devices will be greatly proliferated, and will have connections to commercial, medical, and governmental networks. For example, in the medical sector, patients will be able to log in to their home computer, and thus visit virtual doctor's offices, medical databases, and receive medical prognoses from the comfort of their own home from the data collected through their implanted telemetric devices. However, this online network presents large security concerns because it has been proven by several U.S. universities that hackers could get onto these networks and shut down peoples' electronic prosthetics. Cyborg data mining refers to the collection of data produced by implantable devices.

These sorts of technologies are already present in the U.S. workforce as a firm in River Falls, Wisconsin, called Three Square Market partnered with a Swedish firm Biohacks Technology to implant RFID microchips (which are about the size of a grain of rice) in the hands of its employees that allow employees to access offices, computers, and even vending machines. More than 50 of the firm's 85 employees were chipped. It was confirmed that the American Food and Drug Administration approved of these implantations. If these devices are to be proliferated within society, then the question that begs to be answered is what regulatory agency will oversee the operations, monitoring, and security of these devices? According to this case study of Three Square Market, it seems that the FDA is assuming a role in regulating and monitoring these devices. It has been argued that a new regulatory framework needs to be developed so that the law keeps up with developments in implantable technologies.

== Cyborg Foundation ==
In 2010, the Cyborg Foundation became the world's first international organization dedicated to help humans become cyborgs. The foundation was created by cyborg Neil Harbisson and Moon Ribas as a response to the growing number of letters and emails received from people around the world interested in becoming cyborgs. The foundation's main aims are to extend human senses and abilities by creating and applying cybernetic extension to the body, to promote the use of cybernetics in cultural events and to defend cyborg rights. In 2010, the foundation, based in Mataró (Barcelona), was the overall winner of the Cre@tic Awards, organized by Tecnocampus Mataró.

In 2012, Spanish film director Rafel Duran Torrent, created a short film about the Cyborg Foundation. In 2013, the film won the Grand Jury Prize at the Sundance Film Festival's Focus Forward Filmmakers Competition and was awarded US$100,000.

== In fiction ==
Cyborgs are a recurring feature of science fiction literature and other media.

== Animal cyborgs ==
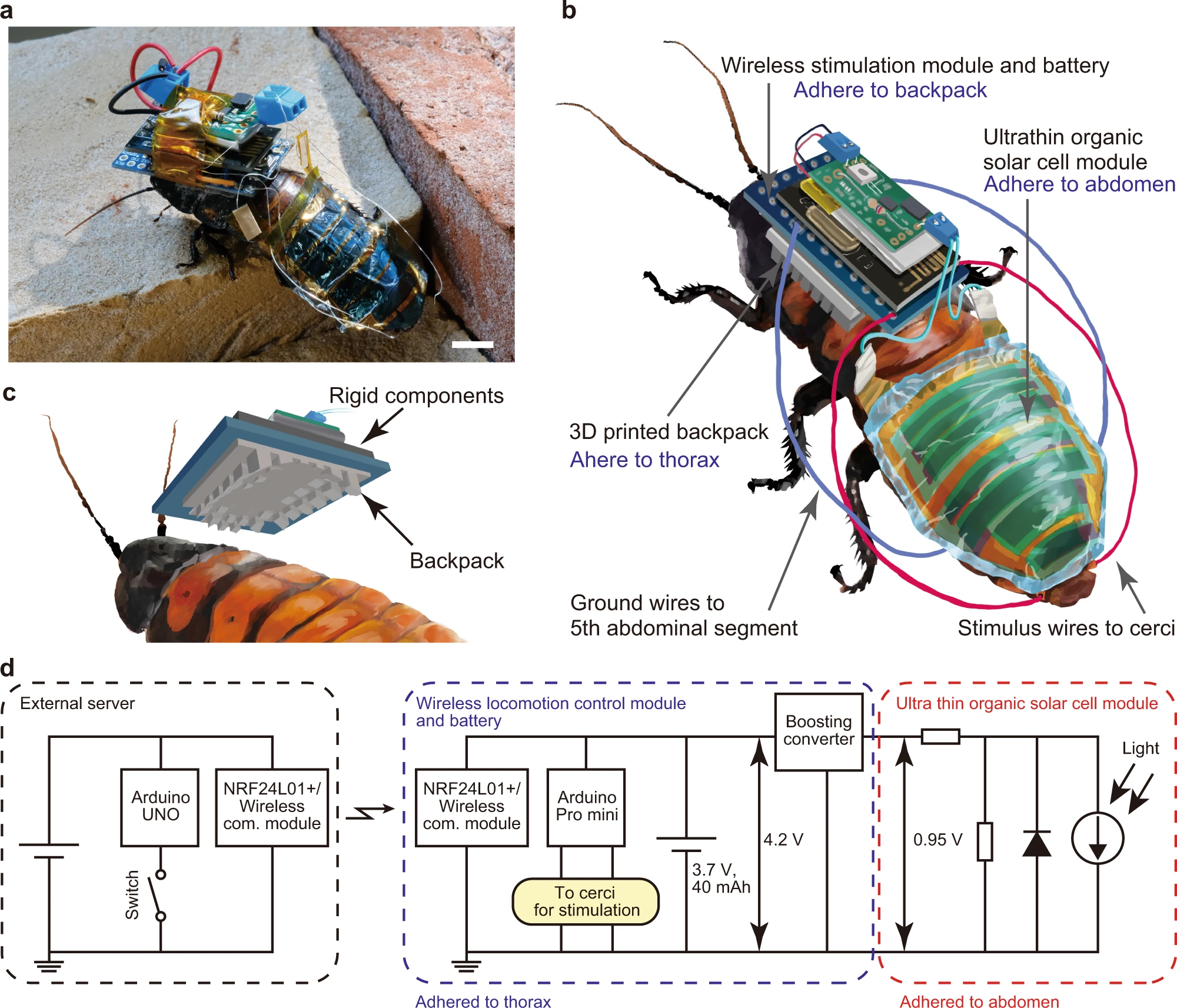
Remote-controlled rechargeable cyborg insects

The US-based company Backyard Brains released what they refer to as the "world's first commercially available cyborg" called the RoboRoach. The project started as a senior design project for a University of Michigan biomedical engineering student in 2010, and was launched as an available beta product on 25 February 2011. The RoboRoach was officially released into production via a TED talk at the TED Global conference; and via the crowdfunding website Kickstarter in 2013, the kit allows students to use microstimulation to momentarily control the movements of a walking cockroach (left and right) using a Bluetooth-enabled smartphone as the controller.

Other groups have developed cyborg insects, including researchers at North Carolina State University, UC Berkeley, and Nanyang Technological University, Singapore, but the RoboRoach was the first kit available to the general public and was funded by the National Institute of Mental Health as a device to serve as a teaching aid to promote an interest in neuroscience. Several animal welfare organizations including the RSPCA and PETA have expressed concerns about the ethics and welfare of animals in this project. In 2022, remote controlled cyborg cockroaches functional if moving (or moved) to sunlight for recharging were presented. They could be used e.g. for purposes of inspecting hazardous areas or quickly finding humans underneath hard-to-access rubbles at disaster sites.

In the late 2010s, scientists created cyborg jellyfish using a microelectronic prosthetic that propels the animal to swim almost three times faster while using just twice the metabolic energy of their unmodified peers. The prosthetics can be removed without harming the jellyfish.

== Plant cyborgs ==
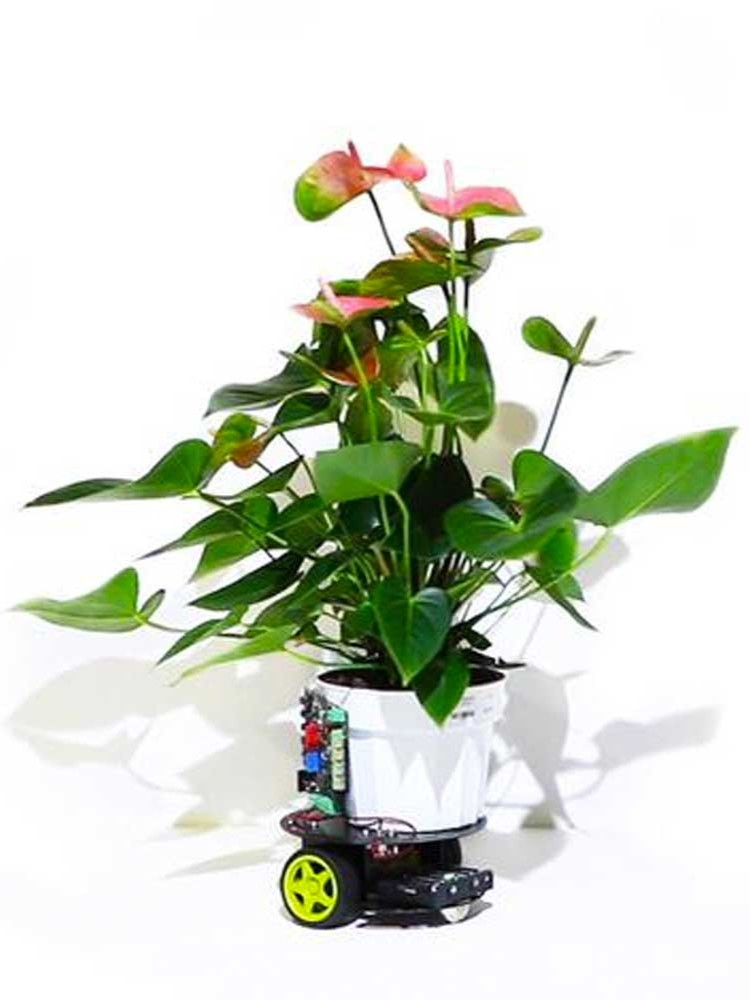
The Elowan project in 2018

In 2018 a MIT team created a simple plant-robot cyborg that they named Elowan. It was able to move towards light sources in response to the natural bioelectrochemical signals within the plant. Commercially produced robots programed to keep the plants mounted on them in light were sold in 2018 by the robotics company Vincross, but the Elowan project created a direct interface between the plant and the robot using silver electrodes inserted into the stems and leaves.

== Bacterial cyborg cells ==
A combination of synthetic biology, nanotechnology and materials science approaches have been used to create a few different iterations of bacterial cyborg cells. These different types of mechanically enhanced bacteria are created with so called bionic manufacturing principles that combine natural cells with abiotic materials. In 2005, researchers from the Department of Chemical Engineering at the University of Nebraska, Lincoln created a super sensitive humidity sensor by coating the bacteria Bacillus cereus with gold nanoparticles, being the first to use a microorganism to make an electronic device and presumably the first cyborg bacteria or cellborg circuit. Researchers from the Department of Chemistry at the University of California, Berkeley published a series of articles in 2016 describing the development of cyborg bacteria capable to harvest sunlight more efficiently than plants. In the first study, the researchers induced the self-photosensitization of a nonphotosynthetic bacterium, Moorella thermoacetica, with cadmium sulfide nanoparticles, enabling the photosynthesis of acetic acid from carbon dioxide. A follow-up article described the elucidation of the mechanism of semiconductor-to-bacterium electron transfer that allows the transformation of carbon dioxide and sunlight into acetic acid. Scientists of the Department of Biomedical Engineering at the University of California, Davis and Academia Sinica in Taiwan, developed a different approach to create cyborg cells by assembling a synthetic hydrogel inside the bacterial cytoplasm of Escherichia. coli cells rendering them incapable of dividing and making them resistant to environmental factors, antibiotics and high oxidative stress. The intracellular infusion of synthetic hydrogel provides these cyborg cells with an artificial cytoskeleton and their acquired tolerance makes them well placed to become a new class of drug-delivery systems positioned between classical synthetic materials and cell-based systems.

== See also ==
- Artificial organ
- Artificial skin
- Brain implant
- Brain–computer interface
- Biological machine
- Biohybrid microswimmer
- Biohybrid robot
- Biohybrid system
- Biomedical engineering
- Bionics
- Biorobotics
- Body hacking
- Electronic skin
- Electronic tongue
- Electronic nose
- Human enhancement
- Hybrot
- Nanobiotechnology
- Necrobotics
- Neurorobotics
- Neuroprosthetics
- Posthuman
- Transhumanism
- Technorganic
- Wetware (brain)
- Wetware computer
- Wirehead (science fiction)
- Organoid intelligence
