= Manel Muñoz =

Spanish cyborg artist and activist

Manel De Aguas
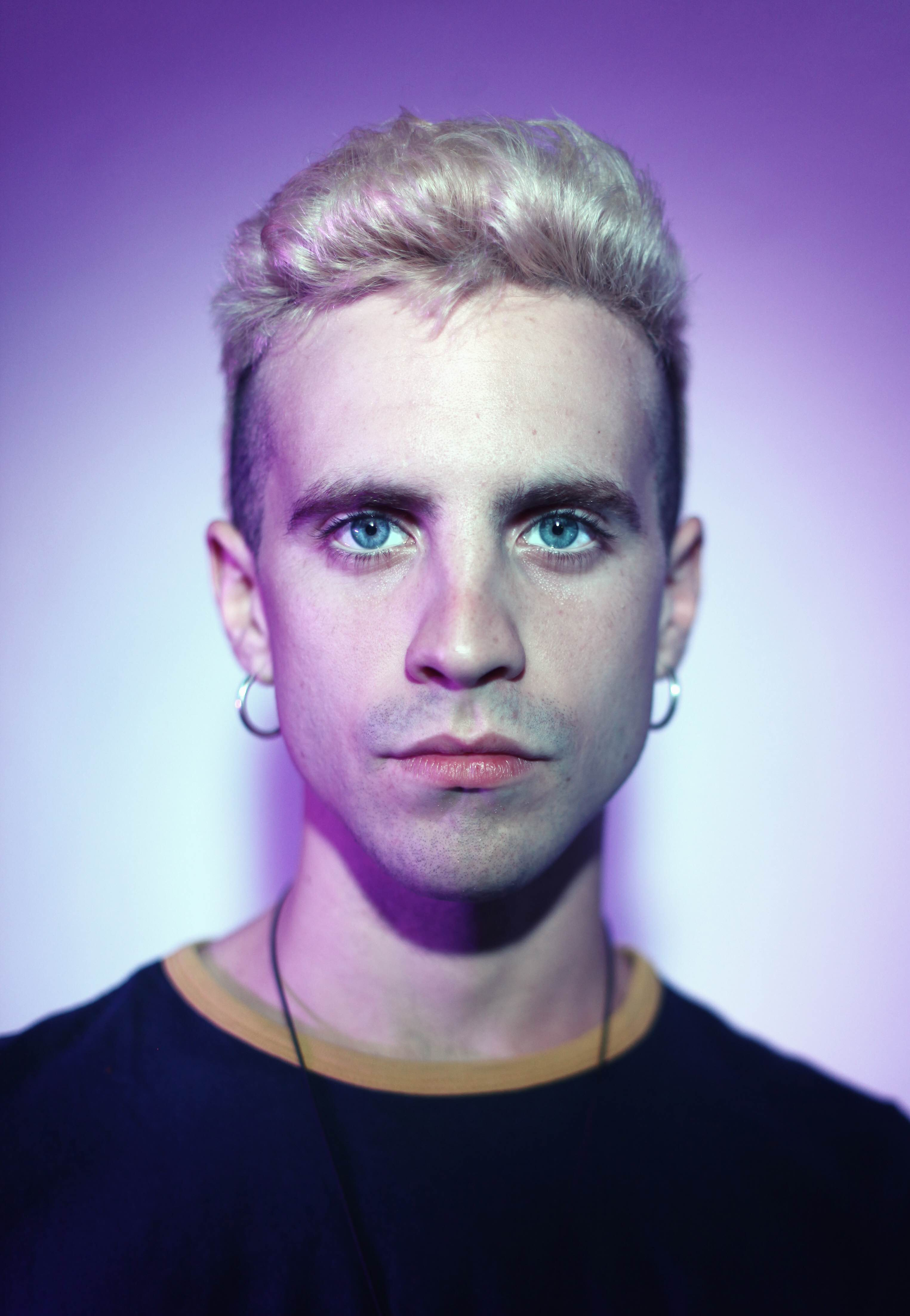
- De Aguas in 2017
- Born: Manel De Aguas Muñoz; 10 October 1996 (age 28); Barcelona, Spain
- Known for: Avant-garde; performance art
- Notable work: Weather Fins
- Movement: Cyborg art
- Website: maneldeaguas.com

Manel De Aguas Muñoz (born 10 October 1996 in Barcelona), known artistically as Manel De Aguas, is a Spanish cyborg artist and transpecies activist based in Barcelona, best known for developing and installing weather sensory fins in his head. The fins, formally known as 'Weather Fins', allow him to hear atmospheric pressure, humidity and temperature changes through implants at each side of his head. Depending on the changes he feels, he can predict weather changes as well as sense his current altitude.

De Aguas studied contemporary photography in Barcelona and became Cyborg Foundation's artist in residence in 2016. In 2017, he co-founded the Transpecies Society, an association that gives voice to people who do not identify as being 100% human and raises awareness on issues they face. The association, based in Barcelona, offers workshops specialized in the design and creation of new senses and organs.

De Aguas has shared his experience as a cyborg artist by performing and speaking in conferences and festivals in Germany, UK, Romania, Spain and The Netherlands among others. He also talks about it extensively in the Shaping Business Minds Through Art podcast.

== See also ==
- Moon Ribas – Spanish avant-garde artist and cyborg activist
- Neil Harbisson – Catalan-Irish musician, artist and cyborg
