= Occipitofrontal =

Occipitofrontal is a term relating to the occiput and the frontal direction, as in:

- Occipitofrontal fasciculus, association fibers in the brain
- Occipito-anterior form of cephalic presentation of birth
