= Sonochromatism =

Neurological phenomenon

Sonochromatism or sonochromatopsia (Latin: sono-, (sound) + Greek: chromat- (colour) + Greek: -opsia (seeing)) is a neurological phenomenon in which colours are perceived as sounds. The phenomenon is created by the union between a brain and a colour-to-sound software or chip. People who report such experiences are known as sonochromats. The term was coined by Neil Harbisson to differentiate his experience of colour from people with chromesthesia or colour-to-sound synesthesia.

== Difference between chromesthesia and sonochromatism ==
The main difference between chromesthesia and sonochromatism is that sonochromatism is not the union between two existing senses, instead, it is the creation of a new sense. Sonochromats do not necessarily sense colour as a visual experience and are able to perceive colours outside the limits of human vision such as infrareds and ultraviolets. Their experience of colour is not involuntary, instead, it is caused by voluntary action such as a colour-to-sound chip implant or constant use of an eyeborg. The sounds perceived for each colour are not subjective, they are objective and they are related to the light frequencies of colour.

== Harbisson's Sonochromatic Scales ==
Pure Sonochromatic Scale

Implantable colour-to-sound chips, software, mobile apps and cyborg antennas use Harbisson's Sonochromatic Scales as a standard transposition of colour frequencies to sound frequencies.

The Sonochromatic Music Scale is a microtonal and logarithmic scale with 360 notes in an octave. Each note corresponds to a specific degree of the color wheel.

Harbisson's Pure Sonochromatic Scale is a non-logarithmic scale based on the transposition of light frequencies to sound frequencies. The scale includes infrareds and ultraviolets, discards colour as being part of a colour wheel and ignores musical/logarithmic perception so it can overstep the limits of human perception.

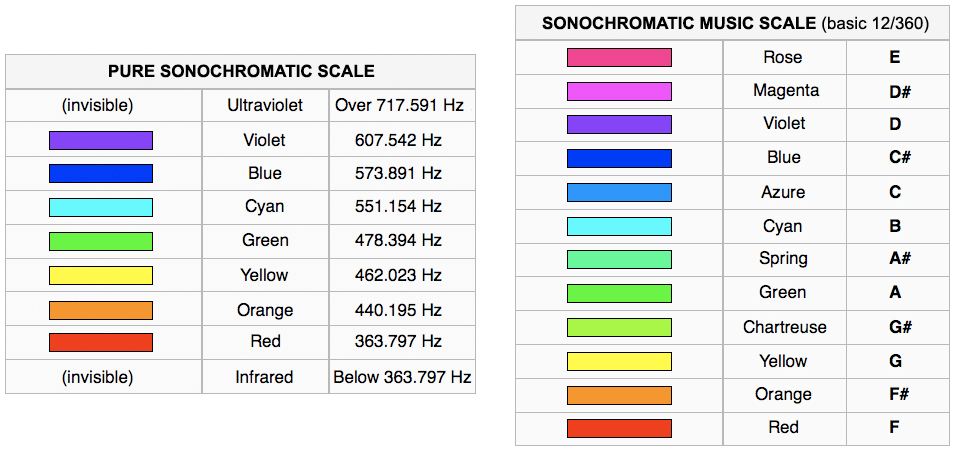
