= Luís Prista =

Luís Vasco Nogueira Prista (1925–2004), or Professor Prista (as he is still remembered by his students and disciples), was a Cathedratric Professor in Pharmaceutical Technology at the Department of Pharmaceutical Technology, Faculty of Pharmacy, University of Porto, Portugal. He is one of the main personalities in pharmaceutical sciences of Portuguese language countries.

== Biography ==
Born in the neighbourhood of Alcântara, Lisbon, 1925, in a family with tradition as pharmacists, Luís Prista received his B.S. in Pharmacy in 1948 at the Faculty of Pharmacy, University of Porto, Portugal. He was offered a place in the same Faculty as second Teaching Assistant in the same year. Later in 1952 he received his PhD, being nominated Cathedratric Professor in 1961. He was also Professor in the University of Pernambuco, Brazil, for a few years (1975 to 1980). He dedicated his life to scientific research and teaching (his teaching skills included Physics, Physicochemical Analysis, Pharmacognosy, Pharmaceutical Organic Chemistry, Galenic Pharmacy, Pharmaceutical Technology, among others). He was also vice-Principal and President of the Scientific Council at the Faculty of Pharmacy, University of Porto, Director of the Department of Pharmaceutical Technology at the same faculty, and President of the "Comissão da Farmacopeia Portuguesa" (Portuguese Pharmacopeia Commission). Luís Prista died in 2004, at the age of 79. One of the laboratories at the Department of Pharmaceutical Technology of the Faculty of Pharmacy, University of Porto, was named after Prof. Prista.

== Scientific Publications ==
While being the author of several scientific books and articles in pharmaceutical sciences (around two hundred in Portuguese and international scientific journals), his most recognized work is the book series "Técnica Farmacêutica e Farmácia Galénica", later renamed "Tecnologia Farmacêutica". This reference work includes three volumes on the discipline of Pharmaceutical Technology, being used today as a major reference in several Portuguese and Brazilian Faculties of Pharmacy.

== Quotes by Professor Prista ==
"O farmacêutico tem o direito de pensar e o dever de alertar" (The pharmacist has the right to think and the duty to alert)
