= SFOF =

SFOF may refer to:

- Space Flight Operations Facility, a space control building in Pasadena, California
- Superior fronto-occipital fasciculus, a controversial nerve bundle in the brain
