= Jose G. Dorea =

José Garrofe Dórea
- Born: October 8, 1944
- Died: May 25, 2023 (aged 78)
- Education: University of Massachusetts Amherst
- Scientific career
- Fields: Food science, toxicology, environmental health
- Workplaces: University of Brasília, University of Hawaii, Iowa State University
- Thesis: Studies of the effects of thyroid on calcium metabolism in the domestic fowl (Gallus domesticus) (1975)

Jose G. Dorea (October 8, 1944 – May 25, 2023) was a professor at the University of Brasília's department of nutritional sciences. He obtained his DVM from the Rural University of Pernambuco, and an MS and a PhD from the University of Massachusetts Amherst in Nutritional Biochemistry. He published over 170 peer-reviewed papers, mostly in the field of heavy metals toxicology. He provided consulting services to the International Atomic Energy Agency, and served as an editor of a number of scientific journals, including the Journal of Pediatric Biochemistry. Dorea published a number of papers regarding the safety of thimerosal-containing vaccines.

In addition, Dorea conducted research concluding that miners in the Amazon exposed to the mercury used to extract gold did not suffer from mercury poisoning as a result.

== Selected publications ==
- Redford, K. H.; Dorea, J. G. (2009). "The nutritional value of invertebrates with emphasis on ants and termites as food for mammals". Journal of Zoology. 203 (3): 385. doi:10.1111/j.1469-7998.1984.tb02339.x.
- c. Barbosa, W. J.; Jardim, W.; Dórea, J. G.; Fosberg, B.; Souza, J. (2001). "Hair Mercury Speciation as a Function of Gender, Age, and Body Mass Index in Inhabitants of the Negro River Basin, Amazon, Brazil". Archives of Environmental Contamination and Toxicology. 40 (3): 439–444. doi:10.1007/s002440010195. PMID 11443378. S2CID 16886377.
- Dorea, J. G. (2007). "Mercury and lead during breast-feeding". British Journal of Nutrition. 92 (1): 21–40. doi:10.1079/BJN20041163. PMID 15230985.
