= Cyborg art =

Artwork, created using extra senses generated with cybernetic implants in the body

2013 talk from Neil Harbisson and Moon Ribas: Life with extra Senses - How to become a Cyborg

Cyborg art, also known as cyborgism, is an art movement that began in the mid-2000s in Britain. It is based on the creation and addition of new senses to the body via cybernetic implants and the creation of art works through new senses. Cyborg artworks are created by cyborg artists; artists whose senses have been voluntarily enhanced through cybernetic implants.

Among the early artists shaping the cyborg art movement are Neil Harbisson, whose antenna implant allows him to perceive ultraviolet and infrared colours, and Moon Ribas whose implants in her feet allow her to feel earthquakes and moonquakes.

- Manel De Aguas, a Catalan photographer who developed fins that allow him to perceive atmospheric pressure, humidity and temperature through a couple of implants at each side of his head.
- Joe Dekni, an artist who has developed and installed a radar system in his head. The sensory system includes two implants in his cheekbones.
- Pau Prats, creator of a system that allows him to feel the ultraviolet ray levels that reach his skin.
- Alex Garcia, whose sensor installed in his chest allows him to feel the air quality levels around him.
- Kai Landre, a musician developing two implants to hear the sound of the particles affected by the collision of cosmic rays.
- Hannah Meltzer, a visual and performance artist who has magnets implanted in her fingers and ears which allow her to feel magnetic fields.
- Dodo K. Doudová, Czech autism rights advocate who has a sensor that allows them to feel ionizing radiation on their own skin as vibrations and a subdermal chip implant.

== See also ==
- Cyborg Foundation
- Manel De Aguas
- Marcel·lí Antúnez Roca
- Marco Donnarumma
- Moon Ribas
- Neil Harbisson
- Shu Lea Cheang
- Stelarc
