= Cyborg Foundation =

Nonprofit organization

- Formation: 2010
- Founder: Moon Ribas; Neil Harbisson
- Founded at: Barcelona
- Website: www.fundacioncyborg.org

The Cyborg Foundation is a nonprofit organization created in 2010 by cyborg activists and artists Moon Ribas and Neil Harbisson. The foundation is a platform for the research, creation and promotion of projects related to extending and creating new senses and perceptions by applying technology to the human body. The Cyborg Foundation was first housed in Tecnocampus Scientific Park (Barcelona) and is currently based in New York City. It collaborates with several institutions, universities and research centers around the world.

Their mission is to assist humans in becoming cyborgs, promote the use of cybernetics as part of the human body and defend cyborg rights. They have donated cyborg antennas to blind communities and have taught the use of colour-sensing technology to blind children to help them develop the sense of colour. The foundation believes that some cybernetic extensions should be treated as body parts, not as devices.

== History ==
Neil Harbisson and Moon Ribas at the Berlin based re:publica 2013 conference: "Life with Extra Senses – How to Become a Cyborg"

The foundation was created as a response to the growing number of letters and emails that Neil Harbisson received from people around the world interested in becoming a cyborg. Since its creation the foundation has kick-started several new-sense development projects and has donated cyborg antennas to blind communities in Europe, Asia and America. The first blind person to try out an eyeborg was Sabriye Tenberken followed by blind students from Braille Without Borders in Tibet and members of the Sociedad de Ciegos de Pichincha in Ecuador.

In 2010, the foundation was the overall winner of the Cre@tic Awards, organized by Tecnocampus Mataró.

In 2012, Spanish film director Rafel Duran Torrent, created a short film about the Cyborg Foundation.

In 2013, the film won the Grand Jury Prize at the Sundance Film Festival's Focus Forward Filmmakers Competition.

=== Collaborations ===
A number of collaborations exist with Ecuador, since its president Lenin Moreno announced that his government would collaborate with the Cyborg Foundation to create new sensory organs.

In 2012, the Cyborg Foundation signed a partnership to create new cybernetic extensions in collaboration with Universidade de Pernambuco in Brazil.

In 2014, the Cyborg Foundation participated in the European Union Commission for Robotic Laws.

In 2016, Cyborg Foundation together with Parsons School of Design, The New School, Sensorium Works and Pioneer Works launched Cyborg Futures, a cyborg residency program in New York designed to further the Cyborg Foundation's mission to support the use of cybernetics as part of the body and begin to introduce the diverse possibilities for artistic practices that utilize extended sensory capabilities.

In 2016, together with Mesa & Cadeira, a group of people (which included a dental surgeon, engineers and a psychologist) created “Design Yourself” – a visual identity, tagline and website for the Foundation. The site explores the different human relationships with technology, and offers tools for expanding senses and abilities, and in the process, for becoming a cyborg. The group also developed a dental implant, that uses bluetooth technology and morse code to communicate. The first demonstration of the Transdental Communication System was presented in São Paulo.

=== Cyborg rights ===
In 2016, together with electronic civil rights and civil liberties researcher and activist Rich MacKinnon, a list of Cyborg Civil Rights were proposed at South by Southwest conferences. This list described the redefinition and defense of cyborg civil liberties and the sanctity of cyborg bodies. It also foresaw a battle for the ownership, licensing, and control of augmented, alternative, and synthetic anatomies; the communication, data and telemetry produced by them; and the very definition of what it means to be human.

The Rights include morphological freedom and the right to bodily sovereignty.

== See also ==
- Cyborg art
- Manel Muñoz
