= Cyborg antenna =

Device impanted in the human skull

A cyborg antenna is an osseointegrated device implanted in a human skull. The antenna, composed of a wireless camera on one end and a wireless sound vibration implant on the other end, allows wireless communication and wireless transmission of images, sound or video from skull to skull. The antenna uses audible vibrations in the skull to report information. This includes measurements of electromagnetic radiation, phone calls, music, as well as video or images which are transmitted through audible vibrations. The Wi-Fi enabled antenna also allows the reception signals and data from satellites.

== History ==
The first antenna was created in England in 2003 by Neil Harbisson. The invention, under the heading Bridging the Island of the Colourblind Project, won a British award in Innovation (Submerge 2004) and a European award in Content Tools and Interface Design (Europrix 2004). In 2007, Peter Kese, a software developer from Kranj, Slovenia, made further developments to the antenna by increasing the number of color hues to 360 and adding color saturation through different volume levels. In 2009, Matias Lizana, a student from Universitat Politècnica de Catalunya developed the antenna into a chip as part of his final year project. The chip allows users to have the antenna implanted and to hear colors beyond the limits of human perception such as infrared and ultraviolet.

== Color to sound scales ==
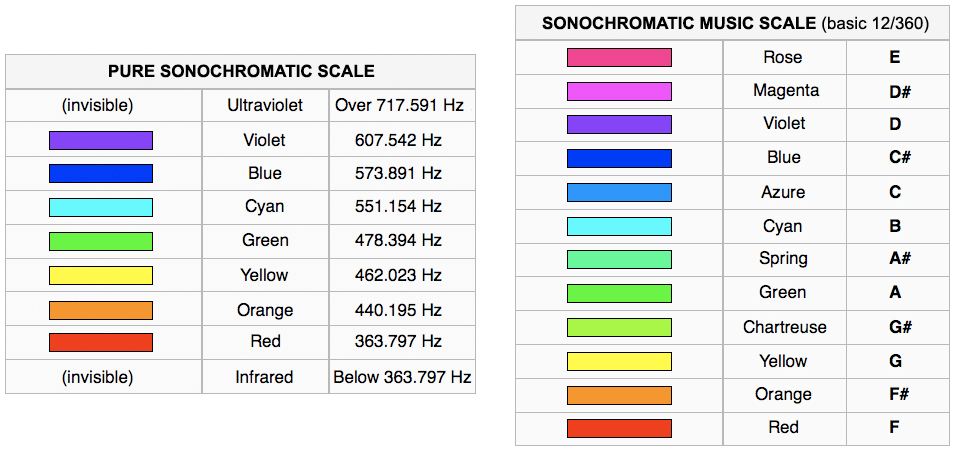
The Harbisson's Sonochromatic Music Scale

Harbisson's Sonochromatic Music Scale (2003) is a microtonal and logarithmic scale with 360 notes in an octave. Each note corresponds to a specific degree of the color wheel. The scale was introduced to the first antenna in 2004.

Harbisson's Pure Sonochromatic Scale (2005) is a non-logarithmic scale based on the transposition of light frequencies to sound frequencies. The scale discards color as being part of a color wheel and ignores musical/logarithmic perception so it can overstep the limits of human perception. The introduction of the new scale to the eyeborg in 2010, allows users to decide whether they want to perceive colors logarithmically or not.

== Collaborations ==
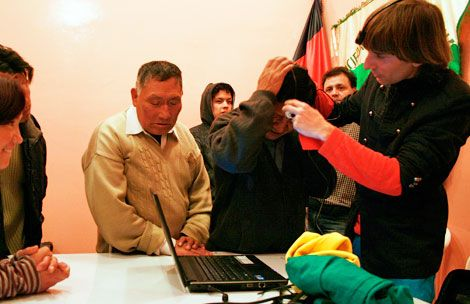
Blind Ecuadorians trying out cyborg antennas (2011)

Since 2005, antennas have been donated to blind communities in Europe, Asia and America with the aim of helping the blind develop the sense of color. The first blind person to try out an eyeborg was Sabriye Tenberken followed by blind students from Braille Without Borders in Tibet and members of the Sociedad de Ciegos de Pichincha in Ecuador.

In 2011, vice-president of Ecuador Lenin Moreno announced that his government would collaborate with the Cyborg Foundation to create antennas and new sensory extensions. In 2012, after lecturing at Escola Politécnica de Pernambuco in Recife, the Cyborg Foundation signed a partnership to create antennas and other new human extensions in collaboration with Universidade de Pernambuco in Brazil.

Antennas are currently being treated as body parts rather than as devices.

== See also ==
- Neuroprosthetics
- Sonochromatism
- Synesthesia
