= Moon Ribas =

Spanish avant-garde artist and cyborg activist

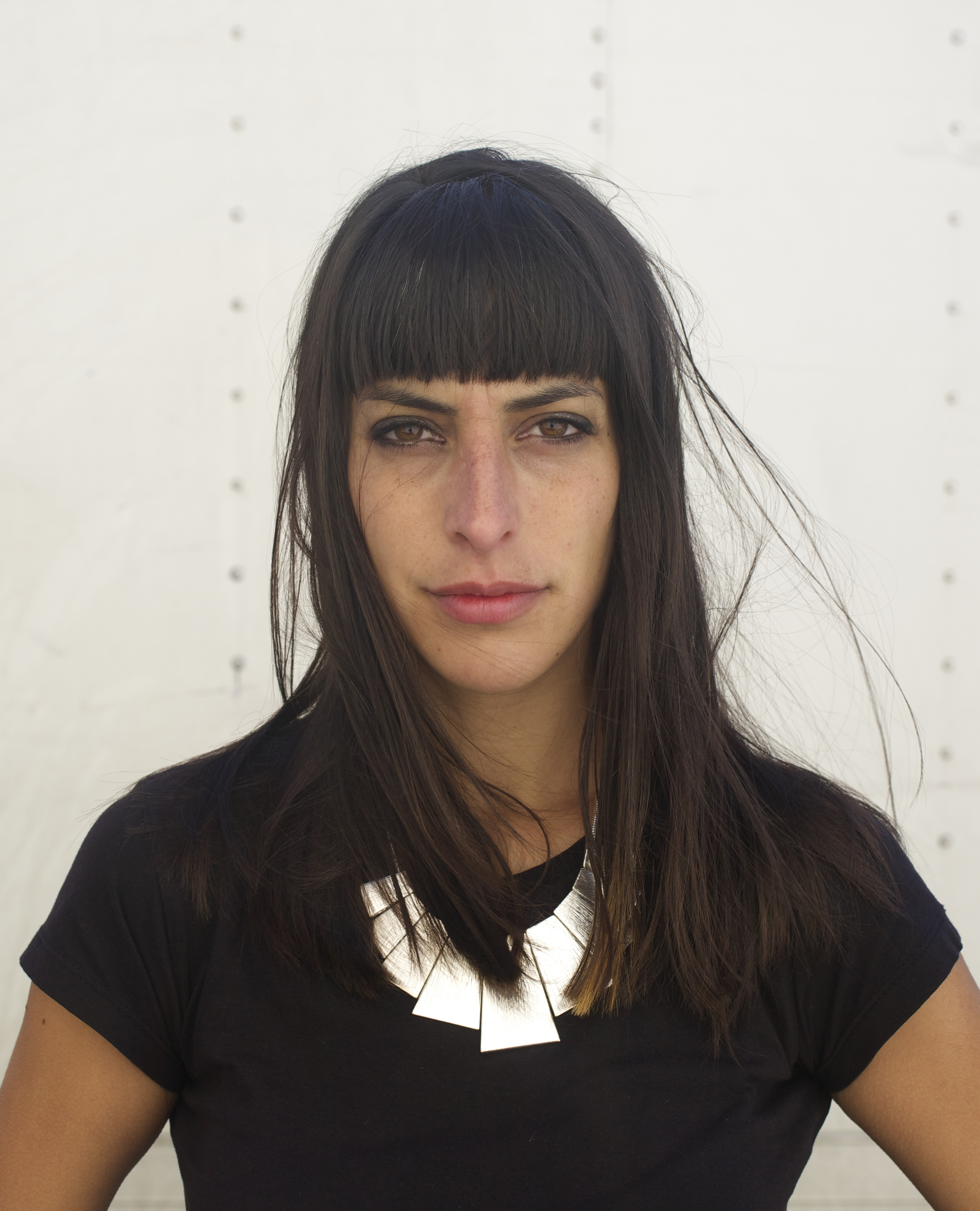
- Born: 24 May 1985 (age 41); Mataró, Catalonia, Spain
- Education: Dartington College of Arts; Theaterschool
- Known for: Cyborgism; avant-garde; performance art
- Notable work: Seismic percussion; seismic dance
- Movement: Cyborg art
- Website: moonribas.com

Moon Ribas (born 24 May 1985) is a Spanish cyborg activist and avant-garde artist best known for developing and implanting online seismic sensors in her feet that allow her to feel earthquakes through vibrations. Since 2007, international media have described her as the world's first cyborg woman or the world's first female cyborg artist. She is the co-founder of the Cyborg Foundation, an international organisation that encourages humans to become cyborgs and promotes cyborgism as an art movement. She is also the co-founder of the Transpecies Society, an association that gives voice to people with non-human identities and offers the development of new senses and organs in community. Her choreography works are based on the exploration of new movements developed by the addition of new senses or sensory extensions to the dancer.

== Career and works ==
2013 talk from Neil Harbisson and Moon Ribas: Life with extra Senses - How to become a Cyborg

Moon Ribas grew up in Mataró, Catalonia, and moved to England at the age of 18 where she studied experimental dance and graduated in choreography at Dartington College of Arts, England, and Movement Research at SNDO Theaterschool, Amsterdam. During her studies she began to explore the possibilities of sensory extensions by applying technology to her body.

=== Seismic sense ===
In 2013, Moon developed a sensor that vibrates whenever there is an earthquake in the planet. The sensor, which is permanently implanted in her feet, vibrates in different levels depending on the intensity of each earthquake, and is wirelessly connected to online seismographs. This means she can feel earthquakes from all over the world regardless of where she is. Moon has been wearing the sensor permanently since March 2013, and has used her seismic sense to create dance pieces. Waiting for Earthquakes is a solo dance performance where the dancer stands still until an earthquake is felt. The choreography depends on the earthquakes felt during the duration of the performance and the intensity of the dancer's movements depend on the magnitude of each earthquake (which can be felt from 1.0 in the Richter scale). If there are no earthquakes during the time of performance, the dancer will not dance. The piece was premiered on 28 March 2013 at Nau Ivanow, Barcelona. She discussed this in depth on the Shaping Business Minds Through Art podcast in 2020.

=== Kaleidoscopic vision ===
Moon's first sensory experiment was in 2007, when she created and wore a pair of kaleidoscopic glasses for three months. The glasses only allowed her to see colour, no shape. The lack of shape perception increased not only her sense of colour discrimination but also her detection of movement. Any slight change of colour in her field of vision indicated that something had moved. During the three-month period, Moon visited several cities in Europe and met people without ever seeing their faces.

=== Speedborg ===
In 2008, Moon created a speedometer glove that allowed her to perceive the exact speed of any movement around her through vibrations on her hand. She wore the glove for several months and was able to sense different speeds depending on the vibration intervals. She later transformed the glove into a pair of earrings that vibrated whenever there was presence around her. Moon travelled around Europe with her speedborg earrings to find out what the average walking speed of citizens was in different cities. The Speeds of Europe is a video dance that shows the results of her research; Londoners and Stockholm citizens for example walk at a similar average speed of approximately 6.1 km/h whereas people in Rome and Oslo walk at an average speed of 4 km/h.

By 2009, Moon was able to detect not only the exact speed of any person walking in front of her but also her own speed. Knowing her own speed allowed her to create Green Lights, a piece choreographed in relation to a set of eight traffic lights: by learning the traffic light timings of Barcelona's Rambla de Catalunya avenue and by measuring the distance between each traffic light, she calculated the speed she had to walk to avoid red traffic lights and was able to get from one end to the other end of the avenue without stops.

=== 360° perception ===
In 2010, Moon explored the possibilities of sensing movement behind her by turning the speedborg earrings around. The earrings were developed further by students from La Salle (Barcelona) by adding four extra sensors in order to gain 360° perception of movement through vibrations around the head.

== Cyborg Foundation ==
In 2010, Moon Ribas and Neil Harbisson created the Cyborg Foundation (and an offshoot of it called the Cyborg Arts organization), an international organisation that encourages humans to become cyborgs. The aims of the organisation are: to extend human senses and abilities by creating and applying cybernetic extension to the body, to promote cyborgism as an art movement, and to defend cyborg rights. In 2010, the foundation won the Cre@tic Award, awarded by Tecnocampus Mataró. In 2012 a short film about the foundation was awarded at Sundance Film Festival.

== Awards ==
Ribas has been recognized by

- 2013, Guinness World Record as First biohacker with earthquake-sensing technology
- 2010, Cre@tic Award
- 2010, Stage Creation Award
