= Occipitofrontal fasciculus =

Nerve tract of the brain

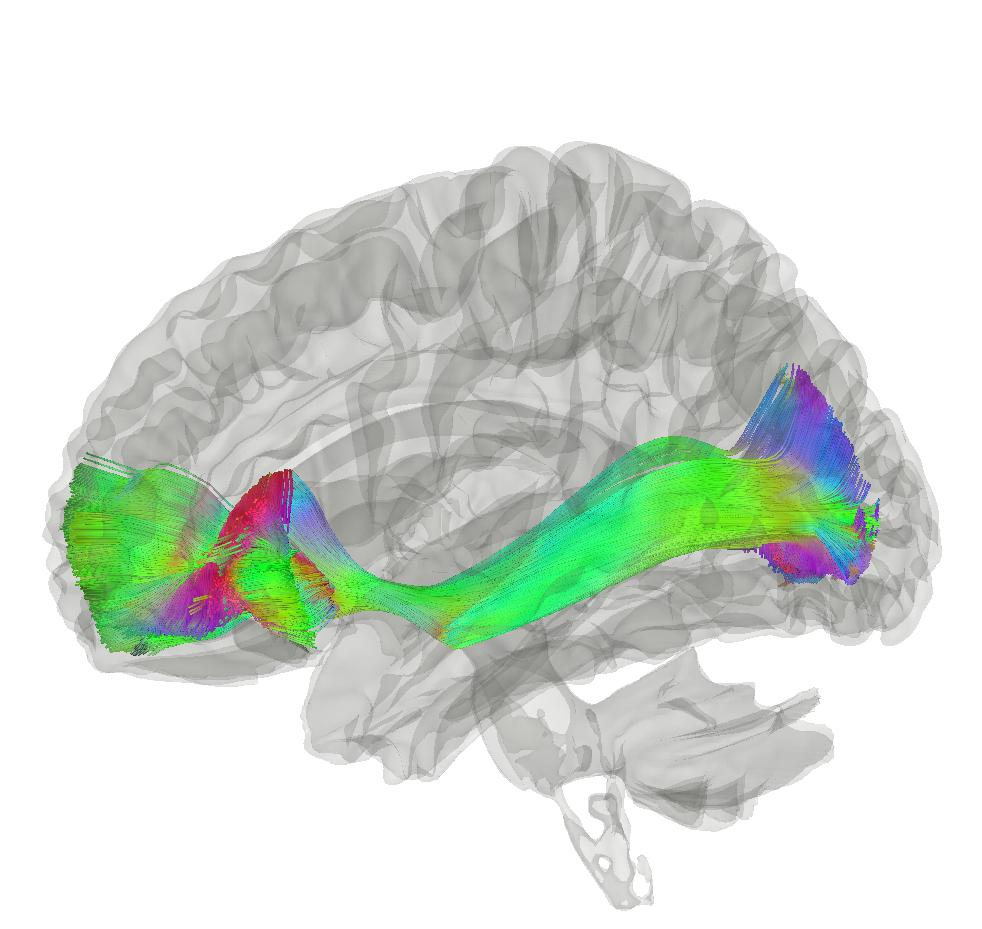
- Tractography showing occipitofrontal fasciculus

Details

Identifiers
- Latin: fasciculus occipitofrontalis inferior
- NeuroNames: 1442
- TA98: A14.1.09.561; A14.1.09.562
- TA2: 5601, 5602

The occipitofrontal fasciculus, also known as the fronto-occipital fasciculus, passes backward from the frontal lobe, along the lateral border of the caudate nucleus, and on the medial aspect of the corona radiata; its fibers radiate in a fan-like manner and pass into the occipital and temporal lobes lateral to the posterior and inferior cornua.

Some sources distinguish between an inferior fronto-occipital fasciculus (IFOF) and a superior fronto-occipital fasciculus (SFOF), however the latter is no longer believed to exist in the human brain.
