= Neil Harbisson =

Spanish-Irish cyborg rights advocate

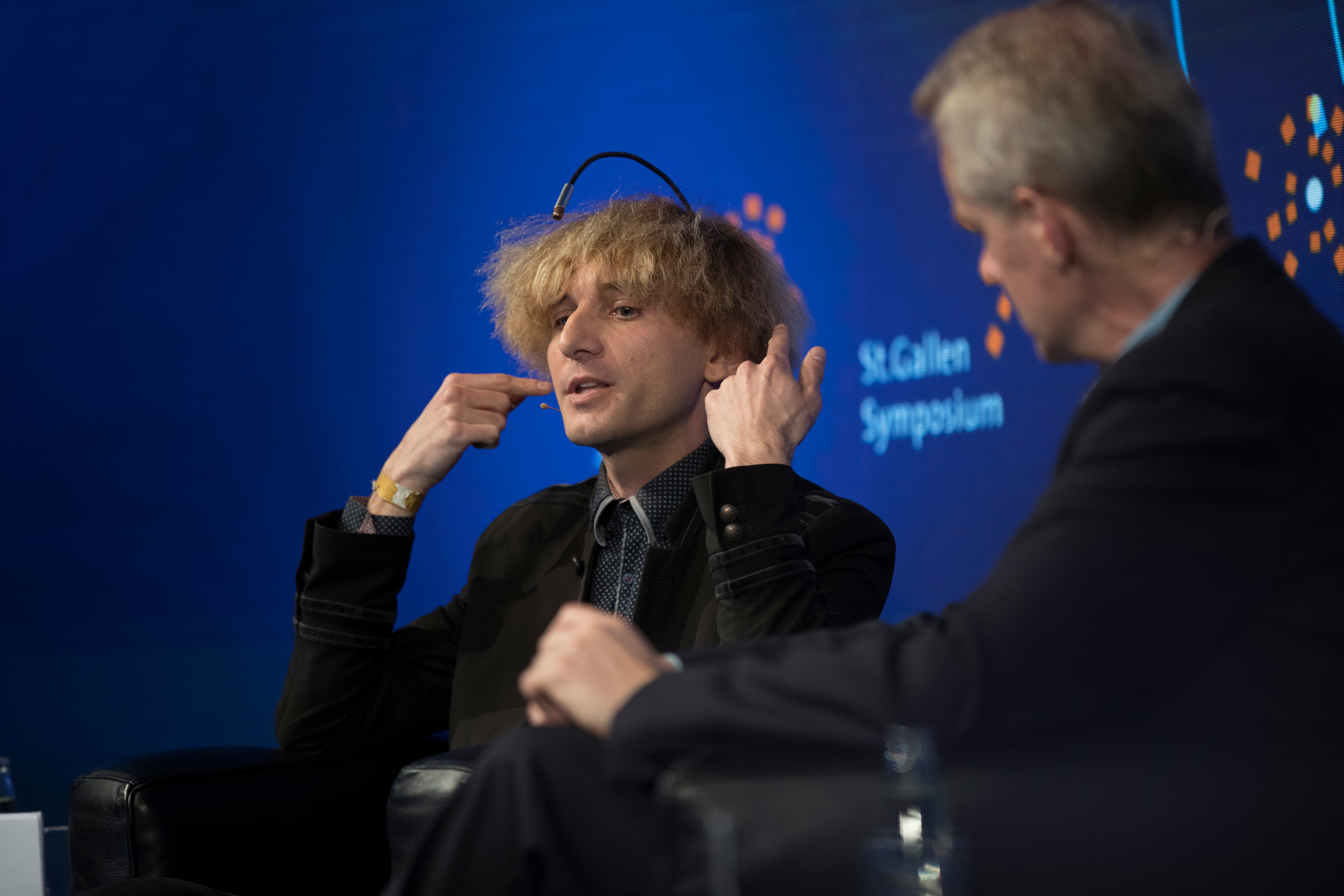
- Neil Harbisson interviewed by Stephen Sackur at the St. Gallen Symposium in 2017
- Born: 27 July 1982 (age 44); Mataró, Spain
- Education: Dartington College of Arts
- Known for: Performance art, body art, cyborg art
- Notable work: Cyborg Antenna, Transdental Communication, Solar Crown, Sound Portraits
- Awards: 2018 Guinness World Record Guinness Book of Records; 2016 Tribeca X Award Tribeca Film Festival, New York; 2015 Futurum Award Futurum, Monaco; 2014 Bram Stoker Gold Medal Trinity College, Dublin; 2013 Focus Forward Grand Jury Award Sundance Film Festival, USA; 2010 Cre@tic Award 2010 Tecnocampus Mataró; 2009 Phonos Music Grant IUA Phonos, Spain; 2005 Best Performing Story ResearchTV, UK; 2004 Innovation Award 2004 Submerge (Bristol, UK); 2004 Europrix Multimedia Award Vienna, Austria; 2001 & 2010 Stage Creation Award IMAC Mataró, Spain
- Website: cyborgarts.com

Neil Harbisson (born 27 July 1982) is a Catalan-raised British-Irish cyborg artist and cyborg rights advocate who has been described as the world's first legally recognised cyborg and as the world's first cyborg artist. International attention grew after he received permission to appear in his UK passport photo with an antenna implanted in his skull, a device he considers a new sensory organ. His artistic and activist work centres on expanded perception, the development of artificial senses and the rights of people with technologically extended bodies.

Since 2004, Harbisson has used his antenna to perceive colour—including infrared and ultraviolet—through audible vibrations transmitted via bone conduction. The device can also receive images, colour data, and signals from external sources, including the internet.

In 2010, he co-founded the Cyborg Foundation, an organisation dedicated to defending cyborg rights, supporting people seeking to extend their senses, and promoting cyborg art. In 2017, he co-founded the Transpecies Society, which advocates for self-design and recognition of individuals with non-human identities or sensory systems.

== Early life ==
Harbisson was born to a Spanish mother and a Northern Irish father. He was born with achromat vision. Raised in Barcelona where he studied piano and began composing at the age of 11. During his secondary studies he obtained permission to complete all visual coursework in black and white.

As a teenager, he became involved in environmental activism, notably participating in a tree-protection campaign that drew significant community support. At the age of 19, he moved to England to study composition at Dartington College of Arts.

== Works ==
Harbisson describes his practice as cyborg art, a discipline focused on creating and integrating new senses and organs into the human body. He has also referred to this approach as perceptionism, emphasising the design of new perceptual systems rather than external objects. Within this framework, the artist, artwork, medium, and audience merge; the sensory extension itself is considered the artwork, and the artist's lived experience constitutes the creative act.

== Artificial Senses (AS) ==
Harbisson's practice centres on the design and permanent integration of artificial senses—technologically mediated sensory systems intended to expand human perception beyond conventional biological limits. These devices are treated as sensory organs rather than external tools.

=== Cyborg Antenna ===
The cyborg antenna is a permanently implanted sensory device extending from the back of his head. Originally developed in 2003 with Adam Montandon and later refined by Peter Kese and Matias Lizana, the antenna transposes colour frequencies into vibrations transmitted through the skull. It detects visible and non-visible wavelengths, including infrared and ultraviolet. It can connect to external devices or satellites to receive additional signals.

After several ethics committees rejected the procedure, the implant surgery was performed anonymously. Harbisson has allowed individuals to transmit colours and images directly to his head and has stated that these inputs can influence his dreams. The first public demonstration of a skull-transmitted image was broadcast live on Al Jazeera's The Stream. The first person to make a phone call directly into his skull was Ruby Wax.

In 2014 he created what was described as the first "skull-transmitted painting," receiving live colour signals from Times Square and accurately reproducing them on canvas before an audience at The Red Door.

=== Sense of Time: Solar Crown ===
The Solar Crown is a sensory device for the sense of time. A rotating point of heat takes 24 hours to slowly orbit around the head. When the point of heat is felt in the middle of the forehead it is midday solar time in London (longitude 0°), when the heat reaches the right ear it is midday in New Orleans (longitude 90°). When the brain gets accustomed to the passage of time on the head, modifying time perception can be explored by altering the speed of rotation. Harbisson states that in the same way we can create optical illusions because we have eyes for the sense of sight, we should be able to create time illusions if we have an organ for the sense of time. If time illusions work, he will then be able to stretch or control his perception of time, age, and time travel.

=== Transdental Communication System: Bluetooth Tooth ===
The transdental communication system is composed of two teeth, each containing a Bluetooth-enabled button and a mini vibrator. Whenever the button is pressed it sends a vibration to the other person's tooth. One tooth was installed in Harbisson's mouth and the other tooth in Moon Ribas's mouth. Both Harbisson and Ribas know how to communicate in morse code, therefore they are able to communicate from tooth to tooth. The first demonstration of the system was presented in São Paulo.

== Scientific and academic research ==
=== Neuroscience and sensory substitution ===
Harbisson's use of the Eyeborg has been the subject of scientific research into sensory substitution and neuroplasticity. In 2012, researchers conducted a neuroimaging study of an Eyeborg user identified in the paper as the "main subject", whose characteristics correspond to Harbisson: he had been diagnosed with achromatopsia and had been using the Eyeborg for eight years. The results were subsequently published in 2015 by Alfaro et al. in Frontiers in Systems Neuroscience under the title Hearing colors: an example of brain plasticity.

The study used functional magnetic resonance imaging (fMRI) diffusion tensor imaging (DTI) and proton magnetic resonance spectroscopy (¹H-MRS) to investigate possible brain changes associated with long-term use of the Eyeborg, which is described as a device that converts electromagnetic light frequencies detected by a sensor into sound frequencies transmitted to the skull by bone conduction. The researchers used the Eyeborg's sound-encoding algorithms during part of the fMRI experiment to simulate the sensory experience of using the device inside the MRI scanner.

The researchers reported differences between the Eyeborg user and the control participants used for comparison in functional neural activity, structural connectivity and cortical organisation. During chromatic stimulation, the user's activation was concentrated mainly in primary visual cortex (V1) and part of Visual_cortex#V2/V2, whereas the control participants showed activation across a broader network of occipital, temporal, parietal and frontal regions. When visual images were presented simultaneously with sounds encoded using the Eyeborg algorithms, the user showed broader activation of the auditory pathway, together with activity in temporal, frontal and occipital regions, including auditory cortex and areas associated with language and semantic processing.

Diffusion tensor imaging also identified differences in white matter organisation, including increased myelin density in part of the left inferior fronto-occipital fasciculus. Magnetic resonance spectroscopy identified differences in several metabolite ratios in visual areas. The researchers interpreted the combined functional and structural findings as possible adaptive and compensatory changes associated with prolonged use of the Eyeborg and as evidence relevant to cross-modal neural organisation.

=== Human enhancement and cognition ===
Harbisson's case has also been examined in academic research on the integration of technology with human cognition and the body. Research on experimental and speculative neurotechnologies has discussed the antenna as an example of human enhancement and has distinguished it from a direct brain implant because the device is integrated with the skull rather than brain tissue. Research on extended cognitive systems has used the Eyeborg as an example of an artifact that can become deeply integrated into a person's perceptual and cognitive processes, while examining whether such integration extends the boundaries of agency.

Harbisson has also been discussed as a case study in research on the boundaries of the human body and technological prostheses. A 2022 article in the Journal of Law and the Biosciences used the Eyeborg as an exemplary case when examining whether implanted technological devices should be regarded as part of the body for purposes of bodily integrity and legal protection. A 2021 article in Postdigital Science and Education examined Harbisson in discussions of cyborg personhood, embodiment and the distinction between therapeutic restoration and technological enhancement.

=== Psychology and ethics ===
His case has also been used in empirical research into perceptions of cyborgs. A study published in Current Psychology presented participants with a photograph and description of Harbisson as the cyborg-person stimulus and examined how anthropocentric beliefs, attribution of mind and soul, and perceived moral status were related. The study reported an association between the attribution of mind and soul and the moral status assigned to the cyborg person.

Harbisson's case has additionally been discussed in research on the ethics of human enhancement. A policy forum in Science examining ethical guidelines for human-enhancement research identified Harbisson's osseointegrated antenna as an example of a technology intended to extend human sensory capabilities beyond the ordinary human range, including perception of infrared and ultraviolet wavelengths.

== Music ==
Harbisson studied musical composition at Dartington College of Arts. During this period he coined the term cyborg music to describe a musical practice generated through cybernetic sensory extensions.

=== Cyborg music ===
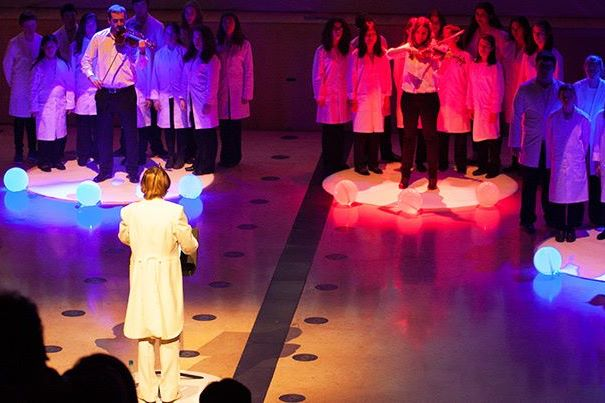
Neil Harbisson conducting a colour concert (a performance in which colours are converted into sound using his implanted antenna) at Palau de la Musica Catalana, Barcelona (2014)

Cyborg music is defined as music produced from internal perceptual experiences generated by devices integrated into the body, rather than exclusively through external acoustic vibrations. Within this framework, data such as colour frequencies or environmental information can be converted into neural stimuli through implanted systems, generating internal tonal perceptions. The body and brain thus function as both instrument and performance space.

An example of this approach is Concerto for Piano No. 1, a composition based on the translation of colours into sound through his implanted antenna. In this work, the phrase "I am playing the piano" was painted onto the piano using differently coloured letters. Each colour was converted into correspondening sonic frequencies via the antenna, generating an internally perceived composition. The resulting work was not audible to the audience, situating it as a case of music generated exclusively as an internal perceptual experience.

He later developed Pianoborg Concerto, a piece for prepared piano incorporating a system that transforms colours into sound frequencies and allows the externalisation of sound through the wood of the instrument itself.

He has collaborated with Icelandic violinist and singer Maria Huld Markan Sigfúsdóttir and with Catalan musician Pau Riba, with whom he shared an interest in cyborgs. Their performances began at the Sala Luz de Gas in Barcelona, followed by others in Barcelona, Cadaqués and Mataró.

== Performances and exhibitions ==
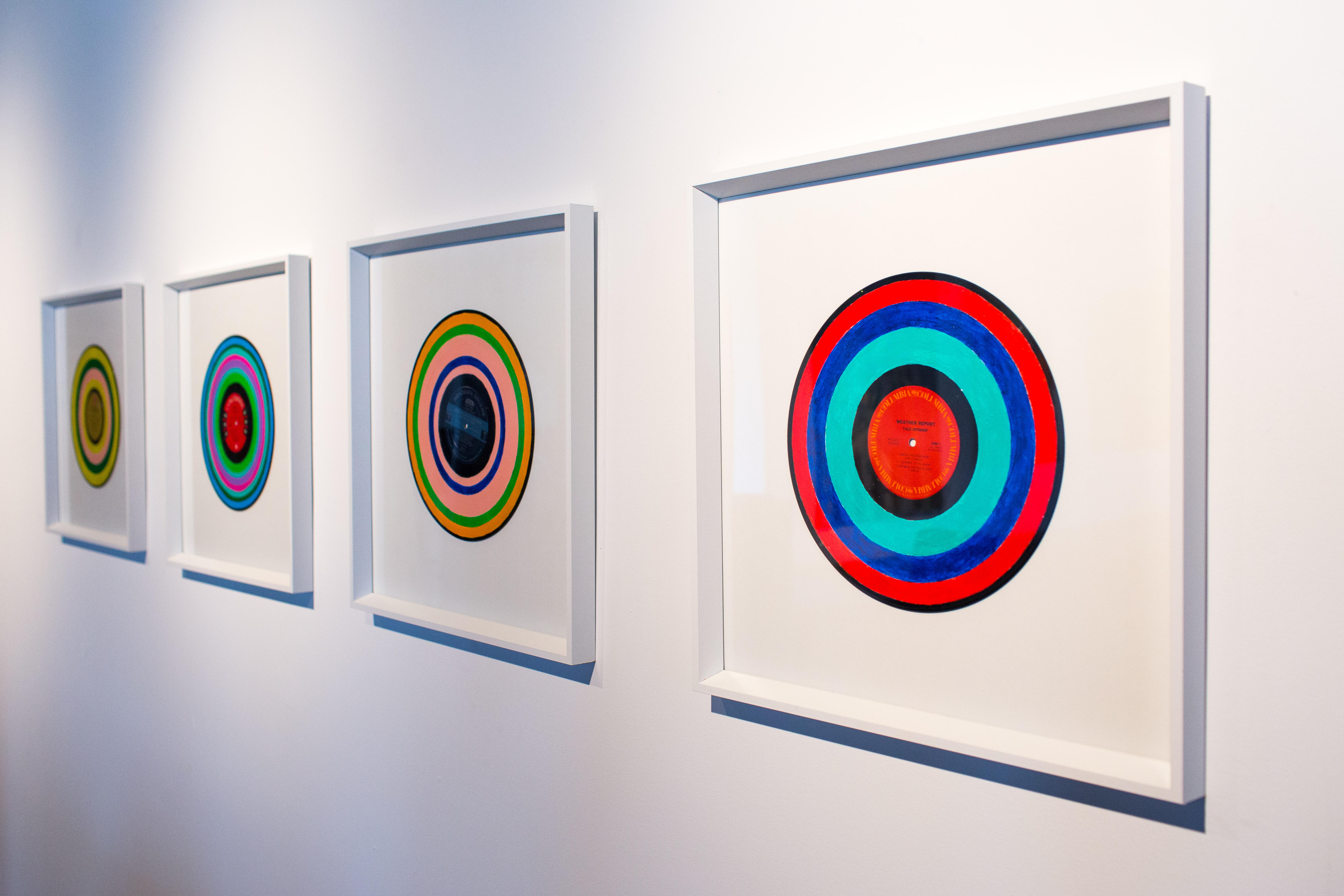
Sonochromatic Records exhibited at Pioneer Works, New York (2014)

Harbisson's work focuses on the creation of new senses and the production of artworks through them.

His work has been exhibited at exhibitions and events including Savina Museum of Contemporary Art (Seoul), CCCB (Barcelona), Pioneer Works (New York), ArtScience Museum (Singapore), Centre d'Art Santa Mònica (Barcelona), American Visionary Art Museum (Baltimore), and during the 54th Venice Biennale, among others.

Harbisson has created a series of "Sound Portraits" by scanning people's faces with his antenna and writing down the resulting notes, which are subsequently used to create sound files.

Harbisson's "Colour Scores" are paintings based on the transposition of sounds, music or voices into colour.

In 2009, Harbisson published the Human Colour Wheel based on the hue and light detected on human skins from 2004 to 2009. The aim of the study was to state that humans are not black or white, but are different shades of orange - from very dark orange to very light orange. Under the title Capital Colours,, he has exhibited the dominant colours of different cities he has visited. He scans the colours of each city until he is able to represent it with at least two hues.

== Public appearances and media ==
Harbisson has given lectures at universities, conferences and festivals including the British Science Festival, TEDGlobal, London Fashion Week, and Sónar.

In 2013, a short film about Harbisson won the Grand Jury Prize at the Sundance Film Festival's Focus Forward Filmmakers Competition. In 2015, the documentary Hearing Colors, about Harbisson in New York, was selected as a Vimeo "Staff Pick" and won the Tribeca Film Festival X Award in 2016.

He has appeared in documentaries and television programmes including Discovery Channel, Documentos TV, Last Call with Carson Daly, Richard & Judy, Buenafuente, and Fantástico.

His work and ideas have also been covered by publications including The New York Times, The New Scientist, Wired, Forbes Magazine and The Scientist.

Harbisson appears in Adam Green's Aladdin, an independent film directed by Adam Green and starring Macaulay Culkin, Natasha Lyonne and Francesco Clemente among others.

== See also ==
- Manfred Clynes
- Oliver Sacks
- Orlan
- Stelarc
- Genesis P-Orridge
- Andy Warhol
- Moon Ribas
- Cyborg Foundation
