= University of Pernambuco =

Public state university located in Recife, Pernambuco, Brazil

Coordinates: 8.04406°S 34.88612°W

- Universidade de Pernambuco
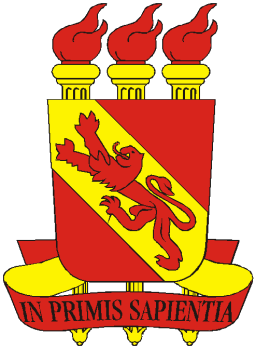
- Other names: UPE
- Type: Public
- Established: 1965
- Rector: Maria do Socorro de Mendonça Cavalcanti
- Location: Recife, Pernambuco, Brazil
- Website: official site

The University of Pernambuco (Portuguese: Universidade de Pernambuco, UPE; formerly Fundação de Ensino Superior de Pernambuco, FESP) is a public state university located in Recife, Pernambuco, Brazil.

Every year almost 4,000 seats of UPE are offered in Brazilian's universities entry exam, the National High School Exam (ENEM). The competition rate is over 12 applicants for each seat, in general.

UPE is well positioned in Brazilian university rankings, such as Guia do Estudante and RUF, with most of its courses being between the 50 best of Brazil. In 2021, UPE was classified as the 45th best university of Brazil and the 100th best of Latin America by Times Higher Education University Rankings (THE).

== History ==
In 1965, the faculties of Medical Sciences of Pernambuco (founded in 1950), Dentistry of Pernambuco (1955), Sciences of the Administration of Pernambuco (1965) joined forces with the Polytechnic School of Pernambuco (1912) to form the initial nucleus of the "Pernambuco Higher Education Foundation - FESP", which became, at the beginning of the 1990s, into the "University of Pernambuco", acquiring public character and assuming its social role.

In addition, the School of Physical Education (founded in 1946) and the Faculty of Teacher Training of Garanhuns (1966), of Nazaré da Mata (1966) and of Petrolina (1968) joined the University of Pernambuco.

In 1976 was created the Institute of Biological Sciences of the University of Pernambuco, a centralizer unit to the basic disciplines of the courses of Medicine, Dentistry, Nursing and Physical Education.

In this way, the UPE has a decentralized campus in several cities of the state (Arcoverde, Caruaru, Garanhuns, Nazaré da Mata, Palmares, Petrolina, Salgueiro and Serra Talhada, in addition to having implemented distance courses of Public Administration, Biological Sciences, Letters and Pedagogy in the municipalities of Fernando de Noronha, Floresta, Garanhuns, Nazaré da Mata, Ouricuri, Palmares, Petrolina, Surubim and Tabira).

== Structure ==
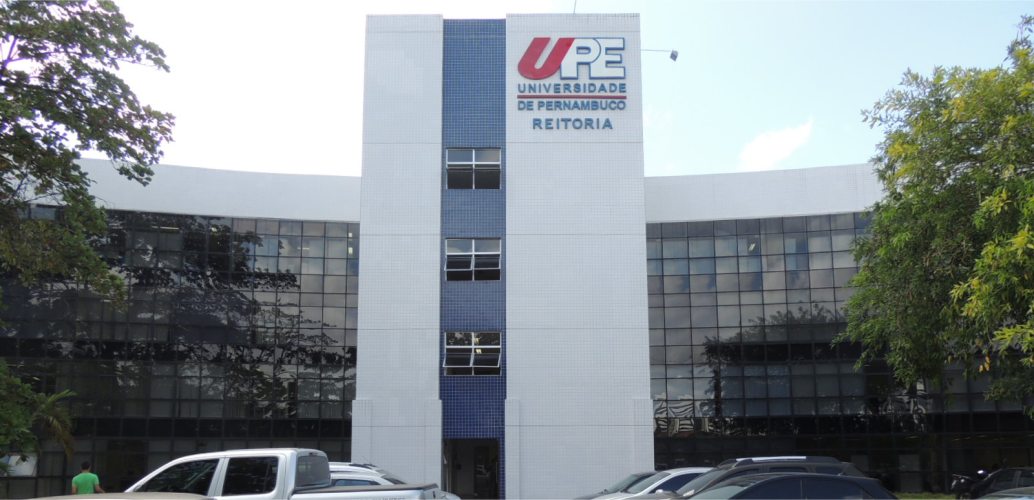
Rectory of the University of Pernambuco

=== Pro-Rectors ===
- Pro-Rectory of Extension and Culture - PROEC
- Pro-Rectory of Graduation - PROGRAD
- Pro-Rector of Graduate Studies and Research - PROPEGE
- Pro-Rectory of Institutional Development and Extension - PRODINE
- Pro-Rector's Office - PROADMI
- Pro-Rector of Planning - PROPLAN
- Attorney's Office - PROJUR

=== Support Units ===
- Amaury de Medeiros Integrated Health Center - CISAM (founded in 1947)
- University Hospital Oswaldo Cruz - HUOC (founded in 1884)
- Cardiovascular Health Center of Pernambuco - PROCAPE (founded in 2006)
- Editora Universidade de Pernambuco - EDUPE
- Technological Innovation Institute - IIT

=== Academic Units and Courses Offered ===
==== Campus Recife ====
- ESEF - Superior School of Physical Education of the University of Pernambuco

Physical Education

- FCAP - Faculty of Sciences of the Administration of Pernambuco

Administration
Law

- FCM - Faculty of Medical Sciences of Pernambuco

Medicine
Collective Health

- FENSG - Faculty of Nursing Nossa Senhora das Graças

Nursing
Social Sciences (Bachelor)

- FOP - Faculty of Dentistry of Pernambuco

Dentistry

- ICB - Institute of Biological Sciences of the University of Pernambuco

Biological Sciences

- POLI - Polytechnic School of Pernambuco

Civil Engineering
Computer Engineering
Control and Automation Engineering
Electrical / Electrotechnical Engineering
Electrical / Electronic Engineering
Telecommunication Engineering
Industrial Mechanical Engineering
Materials Physics (Bachelor)

==== Campus Arcoverde ====
Law
Dentistry

==== Campus Caruaru ====
- FACITEC - Faculty of Sciences and Technology of Caruaru

Administration
Information Systems

==== Campus Garanhuns ====
- FACETEG - Faculty of Sciences, Education and Technology of Garanhuns

Medicine
Biological Sciences
Geography
History
Computing
Letters (Portuguese and their Literatures)
Mathematics
Pedagogy
Psychology
Software Engineering

==== Campus Nazaré da Mata ====
- FFPNM - Faculty of Teacher Training of Nazaré da Mata

Biological Sciences
Geography
History
Letters (Portuguese / English and their Literatures)
Letters (Portuguese / Spanish and their Literatures)
Mathematics
Pedagogy
Technological Management in Logistics

==== Campus Palmares ====
Management in Logistics
Social Service

==== Campus Petrolina ====
- FFPP - Faculty of Teacher Training of Petrolina

Biological Sciences
Nursing
Physiotherapy
Geography
History
Letters (Portuguese and their Literatures)
Letters (English and their literatures)
Mathematics
Nutrition
Pedagogy

==== Campus Salgueiro ====
Administration

==== Campus Serra Talhada ====
Medicine

== See also ==
- List of state universities in Brazil
