= List of avant-garde artists =

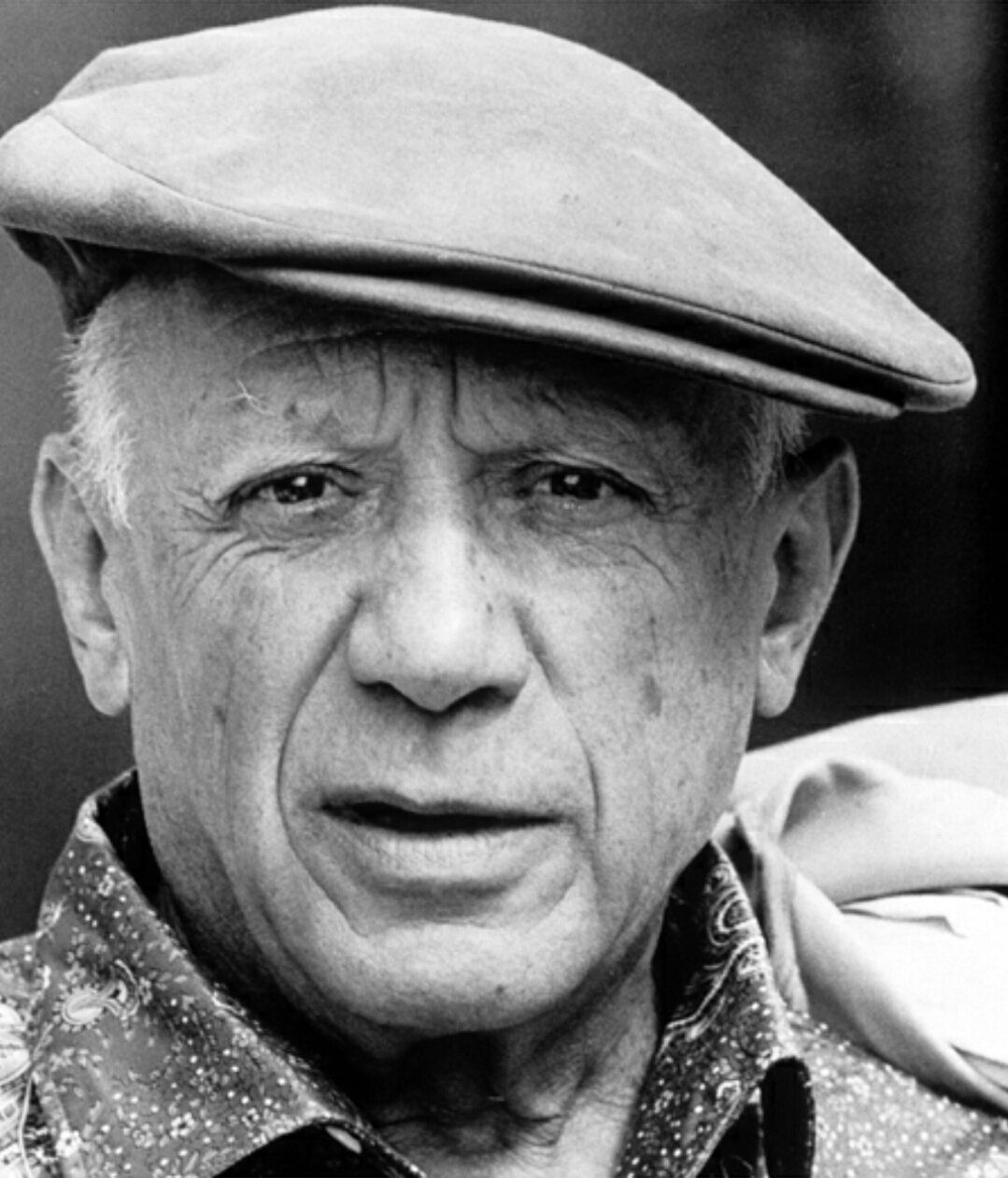
Pablo Picasso 1962

Avant-garde (French pronunciation: [avɑ̃ ɡaʁd]) is French for "vanguard". The term is commonly used in French, English, and German to refer to people or works that are experimental or innovative, particularly with respect to art and culture.

Avant-garde represents a pushing of the boundaries of what is accepted as the norm or the status quo, primarily in the cultural realm. The notion of the existence of the avant-garde is considered by some to be a hallmark of modernism, as distinct from postmodernism. Postmodernism posits that the age of the constant pushing of boundaries is no longer with us and that avant-garde has little to no applicability in the age of Postmodern art.

== Visual artists ==
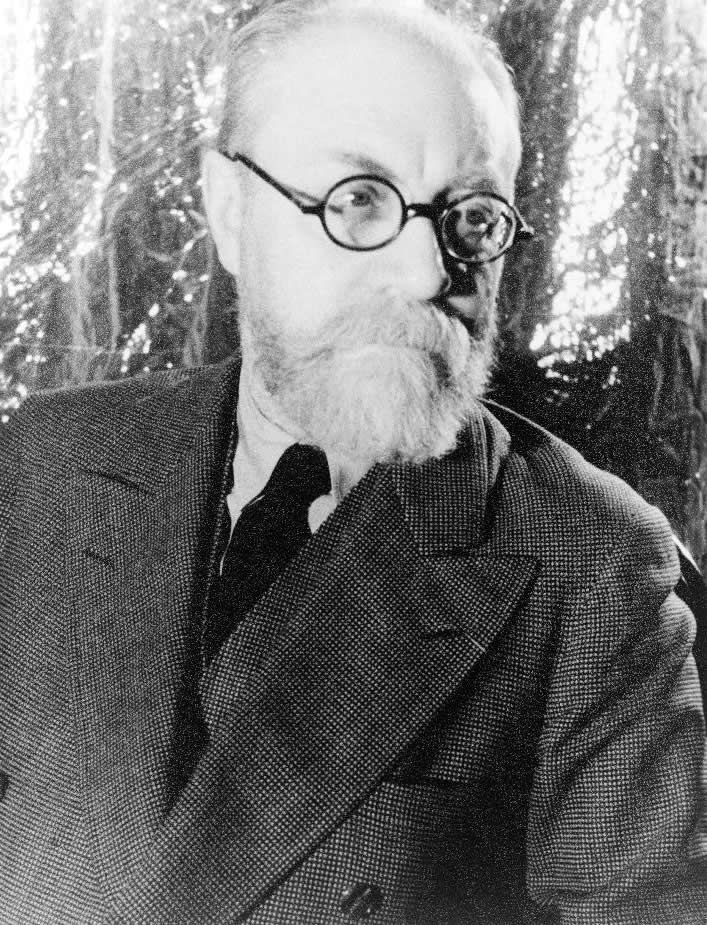
Henri Matisse, 1933, photo by Carl Van Vechten

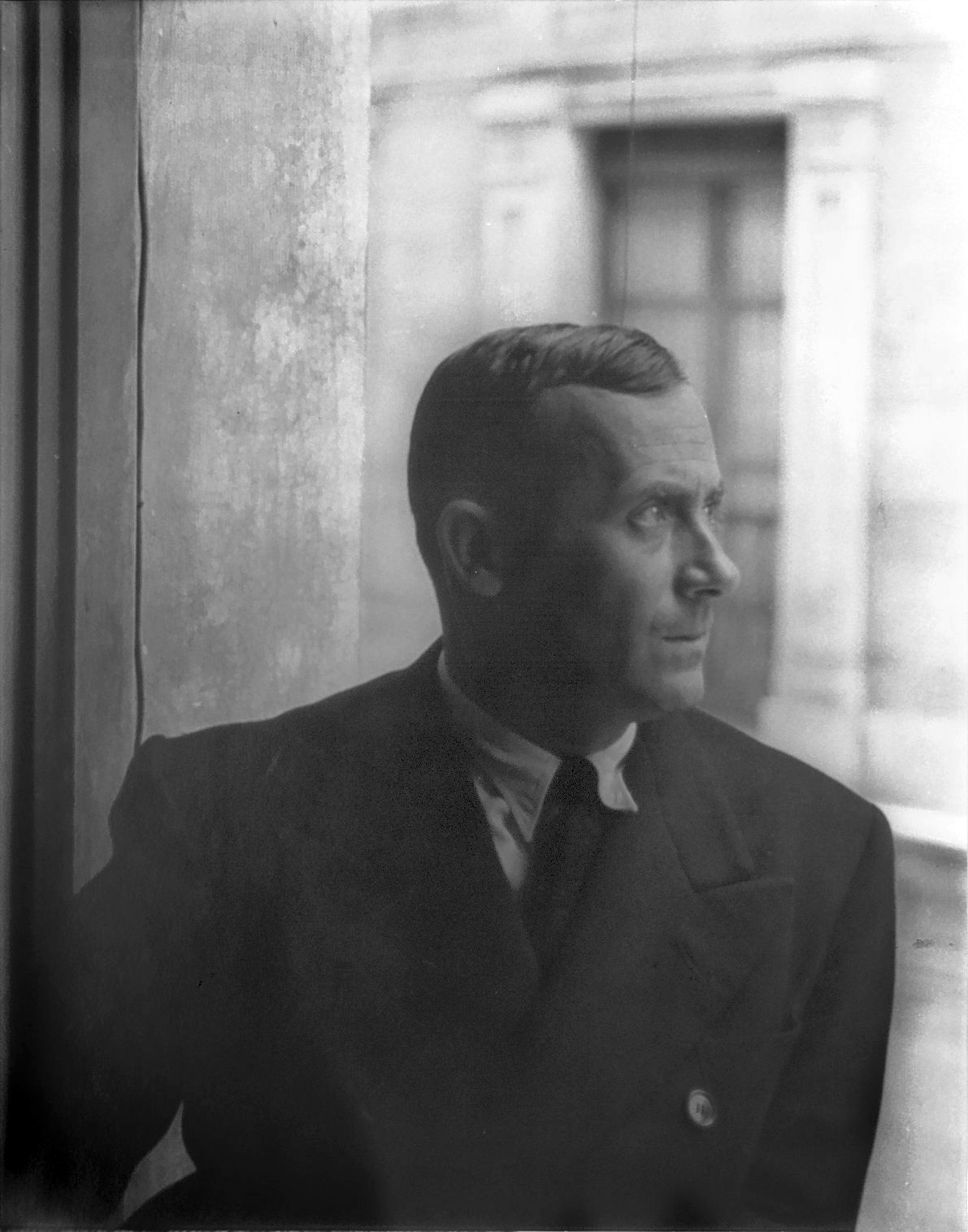
Joan Miró 1935, photo by Carl Van Vechten

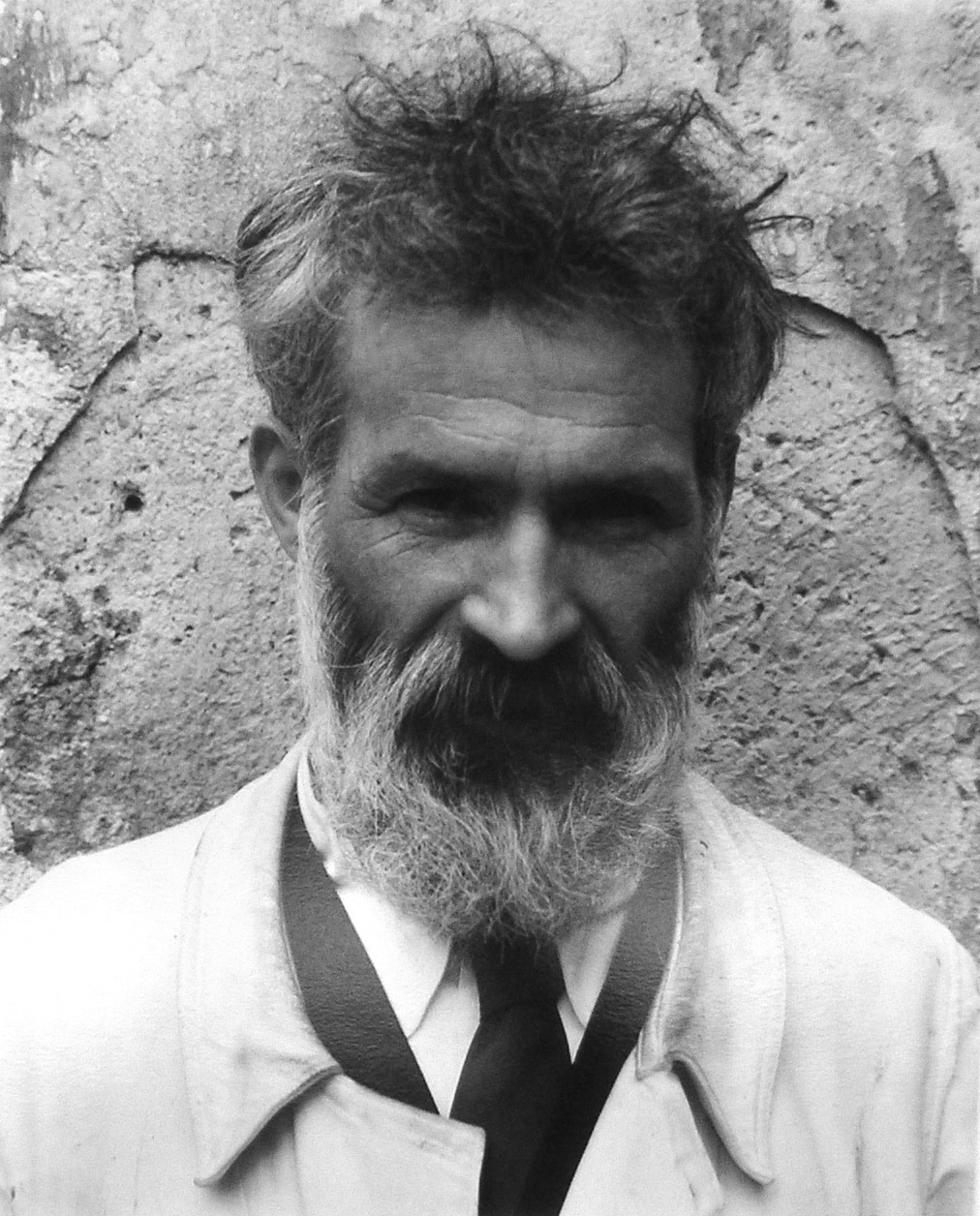
Constantin Brâncuși, 1922, photo by Edward Steichen

- Pierre Alechinsky (Belgian artist, member of CoBrA)
- Alexander Archipenko (Ukrainian sculptor)
- Magdalena Abakanowicz (Polish sculptor)
- Hans Bellmer (German artist)
- Joseph Beuys (German artist)
- Francisco Bores (Spanish painter)
- Constantin Brâncuși (Romanian sculptor)
- Georges Braque (French painter)
- David Burliuk (Ukrainian painter, illustrator)
- Wladimir Burliuk (illustrator, Jack of Diamonds)
- Pilar Calvo Rodero (Spanish sculptor)
- Giorgio de Chirico (painter)
- Joseph Csaky (Hungarian-French sculptor)
- Salvador Dalí (Spanish painter)
- Theo van Doesburg (Dutch artist) the founder of De Stijl.
- Jean Dubuffet (French painter)
- Marcel Duchamp (French artist)
- Naum Gabo (sculptor)
- Pablo Gargallo (Spanish sculptor)
- Paul Gauguin
- Alberto Giacometti (sculptor)
- Albert Gleizes (French painter and theorist)
- Julio González (Spanish sculptor)
- Natalia Goncharova (Russian painter)
- Arshile Gorky (painter)
- George Grosz (German painter)
- Neil Harbisson (English artist)
- Asger Jorn (Danish artist, member of CoBrA)
- Wassily Kandinsky (Russian artist)
- Allan Kaprow (painter/happenings)
- Roger Kemp (Pioneer Australian abstractionist)
- Frederick John Kiesler (designer), (sculptor), (visual artist)
- Willem de Kooning (painter)
- Yayoi Kusama (Japanese artist and writer)
- Fernand Léger (painter)
- El Lissitzky (Russian artist)
- Kazimir Malevich (Ukrainian artist)
- Agnes Martin (painter)
- Henri Matisse (painter)
- Jean Metzinger (French painter and theorist)
- Joan Miró (Spanish painter and sculptor)
- Piet Mondrian (Dutch artist)
- Henry Moore (sculptor)
- Barnett Newman (painter)
- Georgia O'Keeffe (American artist)
- Claes Oldenburg (sculptor)
- Yoko Ono (Japanese-American sculptor/installation artist/musician)
- Francis Picabia (painter)
- Pablo Picasso (Spanish painter and sculptor)
- Antoine Pevsner (sculptor)
- Jackson Pollock (painter)
- Robert Rauschenberg (painter)
- Man Ray (painter and visual artist)
- Ad Reinhardt (painter)
- Jean-Paul Riopelle (Canadian artist)
- Alexander Rodchenko (Russian artist)
- Olga Rozanova (Russian artist)
- Louis Schanker (American printmaker and sculptor)
- Kurt Schwitters (German artist)
- David Smith (American sculptor)
- Kenneth Snelson (sculptor)
- Frank Stella (painter)
- Vladimir Tatlin (Russian artist)
- Remedios Varo (Mexican-Spanish painter)
- Wolf Vostell (German Artist)
- Andy Warhol (American painter and director)
- Wols (German painter and photographer)

== Architects ==
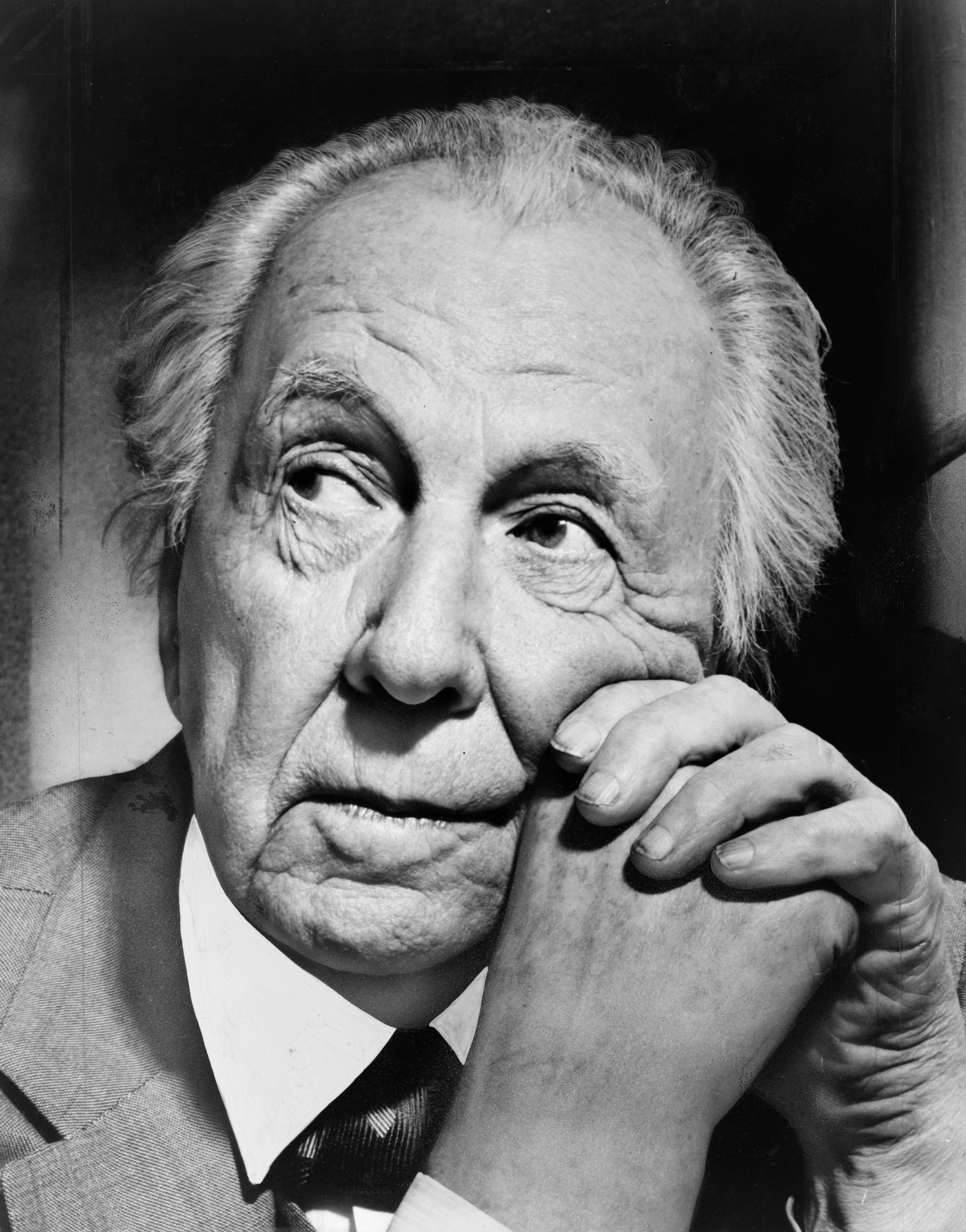
Frank Lloyd Wright, 1954, photo: Al Ravenna, New York World-Telegram and Sun

- Steve Baer
- Le Corbusier
- Norman Foster
- Buckminster Fuller
- Antoni Gaudí
- Frank Gehry
- Walter Gropius
- Mary Jordan (American performance artist)
- Louis Kahn
- Rem Koolhaas
- I. M. Pei
- Ludwig Mies van der Rohe
- Eero Saarinen
- Ettore Sottsass
- Frank Lloyd Wright
- Zaha Hadid

== Performance artists ==
- Marina Abramović (Serbian performance artist)
- Vito Acconci (American performance artist)
- Marcel·lí Antúnez Roca (Catalan performance artist)
- Matthew Barney (American performance artist)
- Günter Brus (Austrian performance artist)
- Marco Donnarumma (Italian performance artist)
- Valie Export (Austrian performance artist)
- Diamanda Galás (American performance artist)
- Hermann Nitsch (Austrian performance artist)
- Stelarc (Cyprus-born performance artist)

== Musicians ==
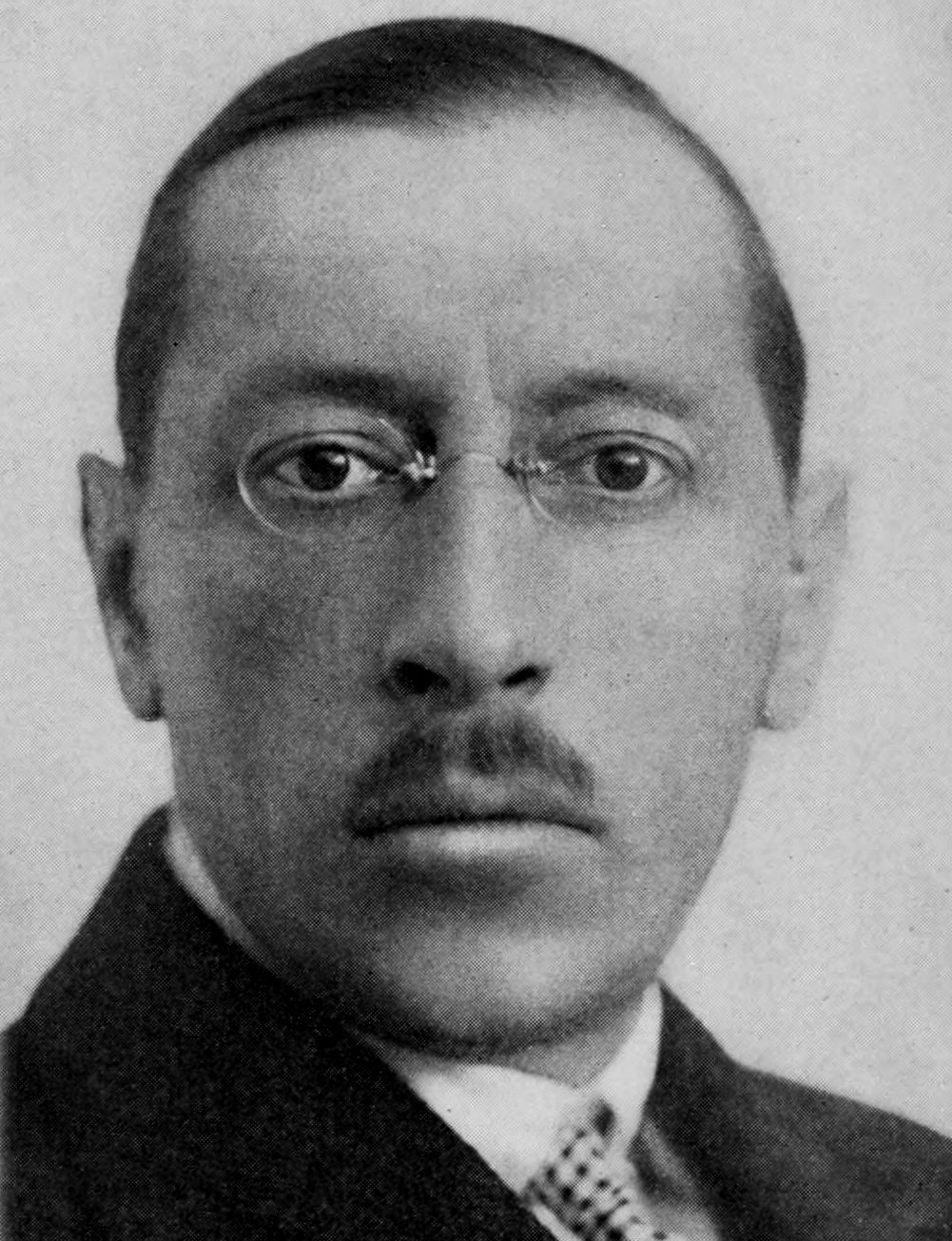
Igor Stravinsky, 1921

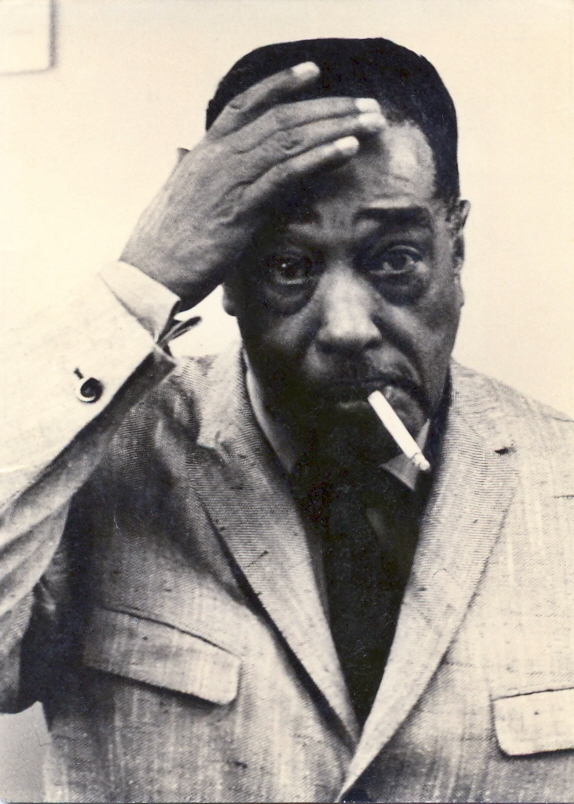
Duke Ellington, 1965 on tour in Frankfurt, Germany

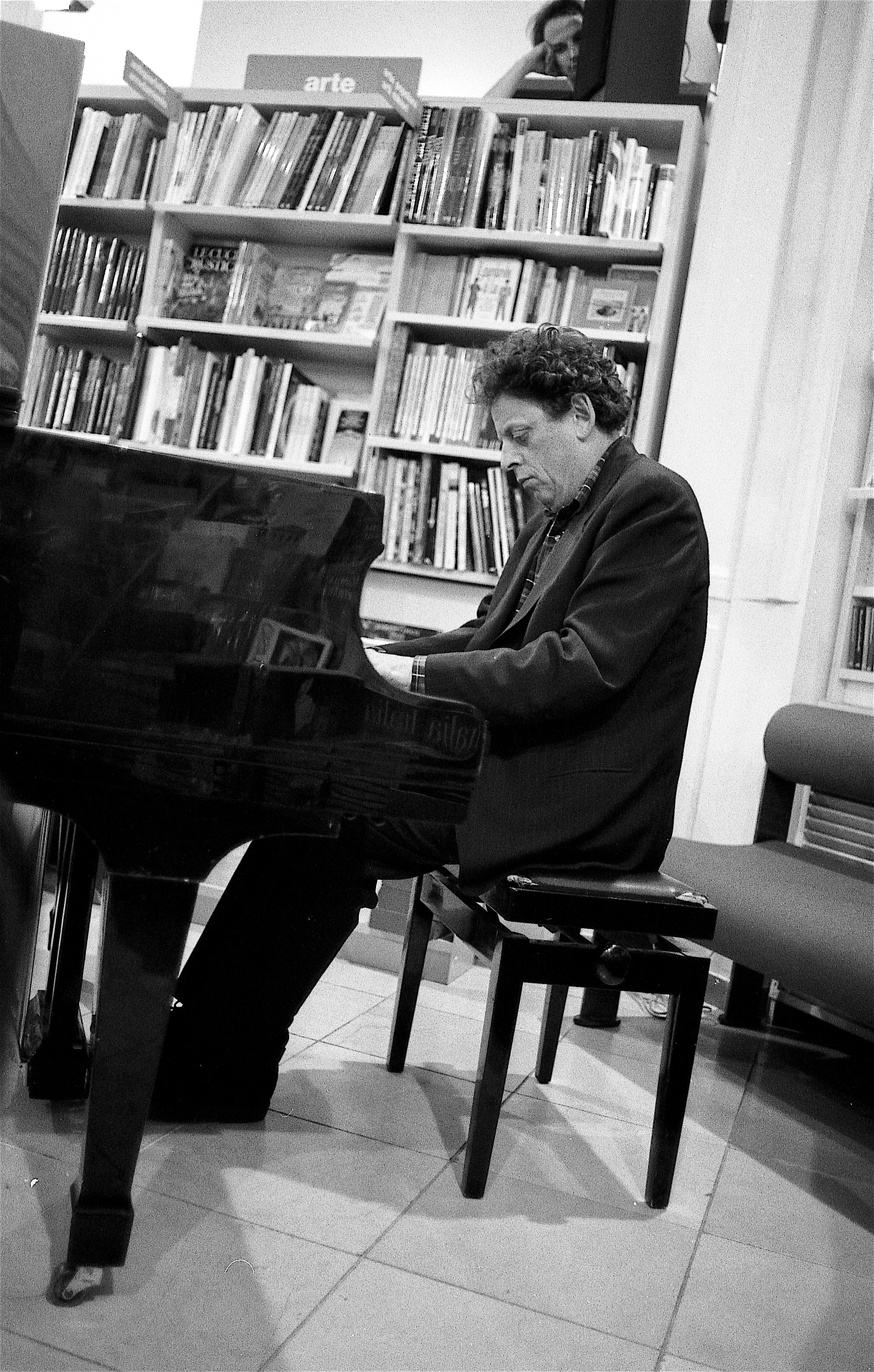
Philip Glass, 1993 in Florence

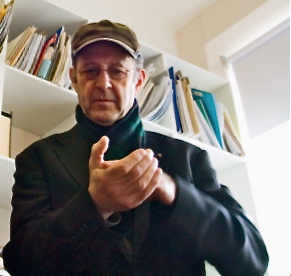
Steve Reich, 2006

- Laurie Anderson (American composer)
- George Antheil (American composer)
- Albert Ayler (Free jazz)
- John Balance (Music Composer, poet)
- The Beatles (English rock lyricists, composers, and singers)
- Luciano Berio (Italian composer)
- Arthur Brown (English rock singer and performer)
- Pierre Boulez (French composer)
- David Bowie (English rock singer and performer)
- Glenn Branca (American guitarist and composer)
- John Zorn (American musician and composer)
- Harold Budd (American composer)
- John Cage (American composer)
- Les Claypool (American musician, singer, bassist, film maker, novelist, composer)
- Ornette Coleman (American jazz musician)
- John Coltrane (American jazz musician)
- Anna Eriksson (Finnish composer)
- Conlon Nancarrow (American composer)
- Tony Conrad (American violinist and composer)
- Ivor Cutler (Scottish avant-musician and poet)
- Miles Davis (American jazz musician)
- Claude Debussy (French composer)
- Eric Dolphy (American jazz musician)
- Duke Ellington (American jazz musician, band leader and composer)
- Don Ellis (American jazz musician, band leader and composer)
- Brian Eno (English musician and composer)
- Aphex Twin (British musician and composer)
- Morton Feldman (American composer)
- Brigitte Fontaine (French Singer, novelist, playwright and actress)
- Aaron Funk (Canadian electronic musician)
- Diamanda Galás (American musician, composer and performance artist)
- Philip Glass (American composer)
- Dave Holland (British jazz musician)
- Charles Ives (American composer)
- Roland Kirk (American jazz musician)
- Bill Laswell (avant-garde musician)
- György Ligeti (Hungarian/Austrian/Romanian composer)
- Witold Lutosławski (Polish composer)
- Béla Bartók (Hungarian composer)
- Lydia Lunch (American singer, poet, writer and actress)
- Angus MacLise (American percussionist)
- Charles Mingus (American jazz musician)
- Thelonious Monk (American jazz musician)
- Max Neuhaus (composer)
- Nikolai Obukhov (Russian composer)
- Mike Oldfield (English composer)
- Pauline Oliveros (American composer and accordionist)
- Yoko Ono (Japanese artist and musician)
- Harry Partch (American composer and instrument designer)
- Mike Patton (American musician, singer and composer)
- Krzysztof Penderecki (Polish composer)
- Astor Piazzolla (Argentine nuevo tango pioneer)
- Jarosław Pijarowski (Polish contemporary musician, poet, photographer, creator of fine arts and theatre-music spectacles)
- Sun Ra (Free jazz innovator)
- Steve Reich (American composer)
- Terry Riley (American composer)
- Diana Ringo (Finnish composer)
- Arthur Russell (American musician, singer and composer)
- Pharoah Sanders (American jazz musician)
- Erik Satie (French composer and pianist)
- Janek Schaefer (English composer musician artist)
- Pierre Schaeffer (French composer, writer, broadcaster, engineer, musicologist and acoustician)
- Arnold Schoenberg (Austrian/American composer)
- Archie Shepp (American jazz musician)
- Karlheinz Stockhausen (German composer)
- Igor Stravinsky (Russian composer)
- David Tudor (American composer)
- Arto Tunçboyacıyan (Armenian vocalist, multiinstrumentalist)
- Edgard Varèse (French composer, later naturalized American citizen)
- David Vorhaus (American electronic composer with the English band White Noise)
- Igor Wakhévitch (French composer)
- Anton Webern (Second Viennese School)
- Robert Wyatt (English singer and songwriter)
- Iannis Xenakis (Greek composer and architect)
- Kathleen Yearwood (Canadian composer)
- La Monte Young (American composer)
- Frank Zappa (American composer, guitarist and satirist)

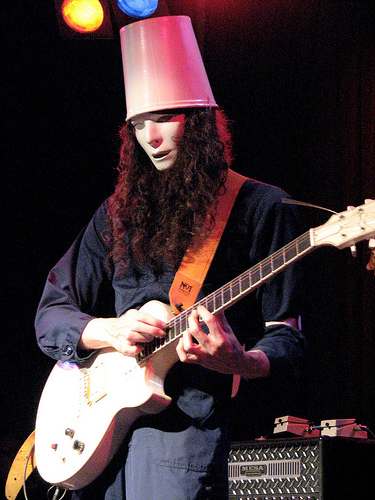
Buckethead

- Autopsia (ex-Yugoslavian/Czech post-industrial band)
- Amon Düül II (German krautrock band)
- Arcturus (Norwegian avant-garde band)
- Maya Beiser (experimental cellist)
- Captain Beefheart (experimental rock singer)
- Boredoms (Japanese noise band)
- Björk (Icelandic musician)
- Buckethead (American composer and guitarist)
- Butthole Surfers (American experimental rock band)
- John Cale (Welsh avant-garde musician)
- Can (avant-garde rock band)
- Coil (British electronic post-industrial band)
- Cluster (German krautrock group)
- Einstürzende Neubauten (German industrial band)
- Fantômas (American noise metal band)
- Faust (German krautrock band)
- Pink Floyd (English avant-garde/psychedelic/art rock Band)
- Gong (French-English avant-garde/progressive rock band)
- Half Japanese (American alternative band)
- Hella (band) (American avant-garde/experimental band)
- Henry Cow (British avant-garde/progressive rock band)
- Iwrestledabearonce (American progressive/avant-garde metal band)
- Jonathan Davis and the SFA (American avant-garde band)
- JPEGMAFIA (American rapper and producer)
- Kayo Dot (American avant-rock/metal band)
- Kraftwerk (German electronic/krautrock group)
- Laibach (Slovenian experimental/avant-garde/industrial music group)
- The Mars Volta (American experimental/fusion rock band)
- Melvins (American experimental rock band)
- Meshuggah (Swedish experimental/progressive metal band)
- Moondog (American avant-garde artist)
- Neurosis (American sludge/drone/post-metal band)
- The Observatory (Singaporean experimental rock band)
- Ours to Destroy (avant-garde folk rock band)
- Pan.Thy.Monium (Swedish progressive metal band)
- Pere Ubu (American post-punk band)
- Art Bears (British avant-rock band)
- Public Image Ltd (British post-punk band)
- Radiohead (English art rock/experimental rock band)
- Ram-Zet (Norwegian avant-garde metal band)
- Rasputina (experimental rock band)
- Recoil (band) (British avant-garde/electronic musical project)
- The Residents (American avant-rock band)
- Scars on Broadway (Experimental rock band)
- Scott Walker (American experimental avant-garde pop musician)
- Sigh (Japanese progressive/avant-garde black metal band)
- Sleepytime Gorilla Museum (American avant-garde metal/rock group)
- Soft Machine (English avant-garde/progressive rock band)
- Sonic Youth (American alternative band)
- Sunn O))) (American drone/metal/ambient band)
- Swans (American post-punk/No Wave band)
- Throbbing Gristle (English industrial band)
- Mr. Bungle (American avant-garde metal group)
- The Velvet Underground (American art/protopunk band)
- Lou Reed (American alternative/avant-garde/protopunk musician)
- Patti Smith (American protopunk singer)
- Vernian Process (American steampunk/avant-garde band)
- Už jsme doma (Czech avant-garde band)
- What's He Building in There? (Canadian avant-garde metal group)
- Waltari (Finnish progressive/avant-garde/alternative metal band)
- John Bruce Wallace (American composer and avant-garde, free jazz, fusion, experimental, improvisational progressive metal guitarist)
- Thom Yorke (English musician)
- Dean Blunt (British musician)

== Authors, playwrights, actors, theatre directors and poets ==
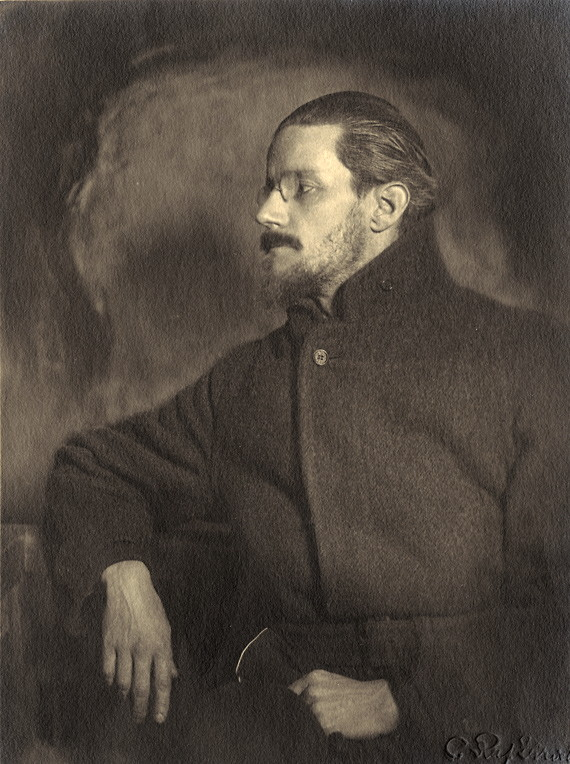
James Joyce, c. 1918

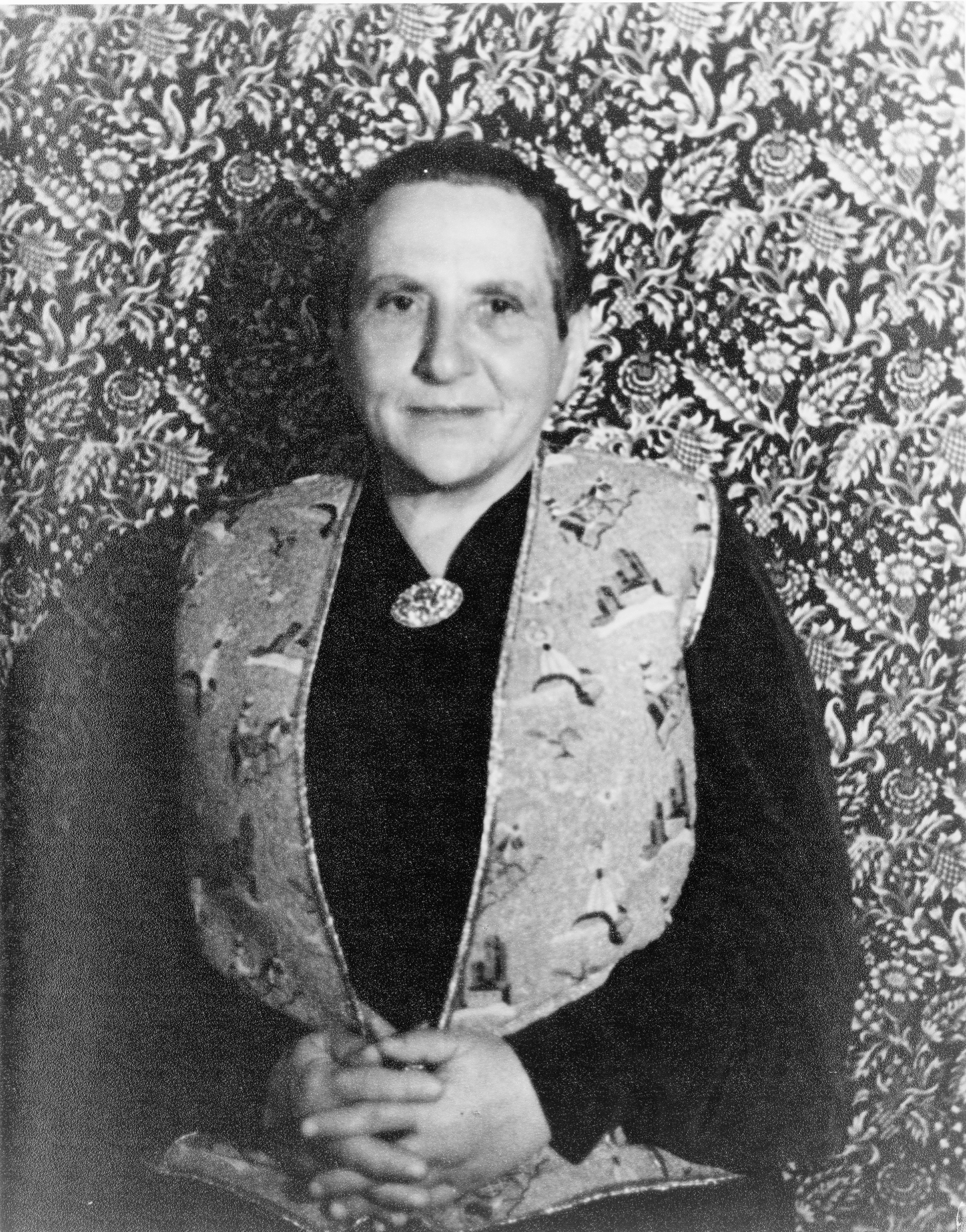
Portrait of Gertrude Stein (1934, Carl Van Vechten)

- JoAnne Akalaitis (writer/director/ Mabou Mines)
- Guillaume Apollinaire (writer)
- Antonin Artaud (French actor, director and theorist)
- H. C. Artmann (Austrian-born poet and writer)
- Hugo Ball (German writer, dadaist)
- J. G. Ballard (British author)
- Georges Bataille (French writer and essayist)
- Julian Beck (actor/director/ The Living Theatre)
- Samuel Beckett (Irish playwright)
- Maurice Blanchot (French writer and essayist)
- Jorge Luis Borges (Argentine short story writer)
- André Breton (French author)
- Hermann Broch (Austrian writer)
- Christine Brooke-Rose (British writer and literary critic)
- William S. Burroughs (author, poet, essayist)
- Jim Carroll (avant-garde poet)
- Louis-Ferdinand Céline (author)
- Gregory Corso (experimental Beat poet)
- Jayne Cortez (American poet and spoken-word artist)
- E. E. Cummings (poet)
- Jeffrey Daniels (American Poet)
- Guy Debord (French author, and philosopher)
- John Dos Passos (American writer)
- Duncan Fallowell (English writer)
- Benjamin Fondane (Romanian/French poet, critic, existentialist philosopher)
- Richard Foreman (American Director/designer/playwright/compositional theater maker)
- Genpei Akasegawa (Japanese artist and novelist)
- Allen Ginsberg (poet)
- Witold Gombrowicz (writer)
- Eugen Gomringer (the father of concrete poetry)
- Jerzy Grotowski (director)
- Stewart Home (writer)
- Per Højholt (Danish poet)
- Ernst Jandl (Austrian writer, poet, and translator)
- Alfred Jarry (writer)
- James Joyce (writer)
- Franz Kafka (writer)
- Tadeusz Kantor (director)
- Lajos Kassák (1887–1967, Hungarian avant-garde poet and painter)
- Daniil Kharms (Russian writer)
- Srečko Kosovel (Slovene poet)
- Peter Laugesen (Danish poet)
- Jackson Mac Low, American poet
- Mina Loy (British painter/poet)
- Dimitris Lyacos (writer/playwright/poet)
- Judith Malina (actor/director/ The Living Theatre)
- Filippo Tommaso Marinetti (founder of Italian futurism)
- Vladimir Mayakovsky (Russian futurist writer and poet)
- Vsevolod Meyerhold (director)
- Henry Miller (author)
- Ion Minulescu (Romanian poet, novelist, short story writer, journalist, literary critic, playwright)
- Yukio Mishima (writer, playwright, poet)
- Vladimir Nabokov (Russian author)
- Anaïs Nin (French diarist, author, poet)
- Ezra Pound (American poet)
- Alain Robbe-Grillet (French author, playwright, filmmaker)
- Raymond Roussel (writer)
- Bruno Schulz (writer)
- Kirill Serebrennikov (Russian theater director)
- Gertrude Stein (author, essayist)
- Ellen Stewart (theater director/ La MaMa)
- Jean Tardieu (artist, playwright, poet)
- Sergei Tretyakov (Russian writer)
- Tristan Tzara (Romanian poet)
- Urmuz (Romanian writer)
- Ilarie Voronca (Romanian poet, essayist)
- William Carlos Williams (American poet)
- Miroslav Wanek (Czech composer, poet, singer)
- Stanisław Ignacy Witkiewicz (writer)
- Robert Wilson (director)
- Virginia Woolf (English author)

== Photographers, filmmakers, video artists ==
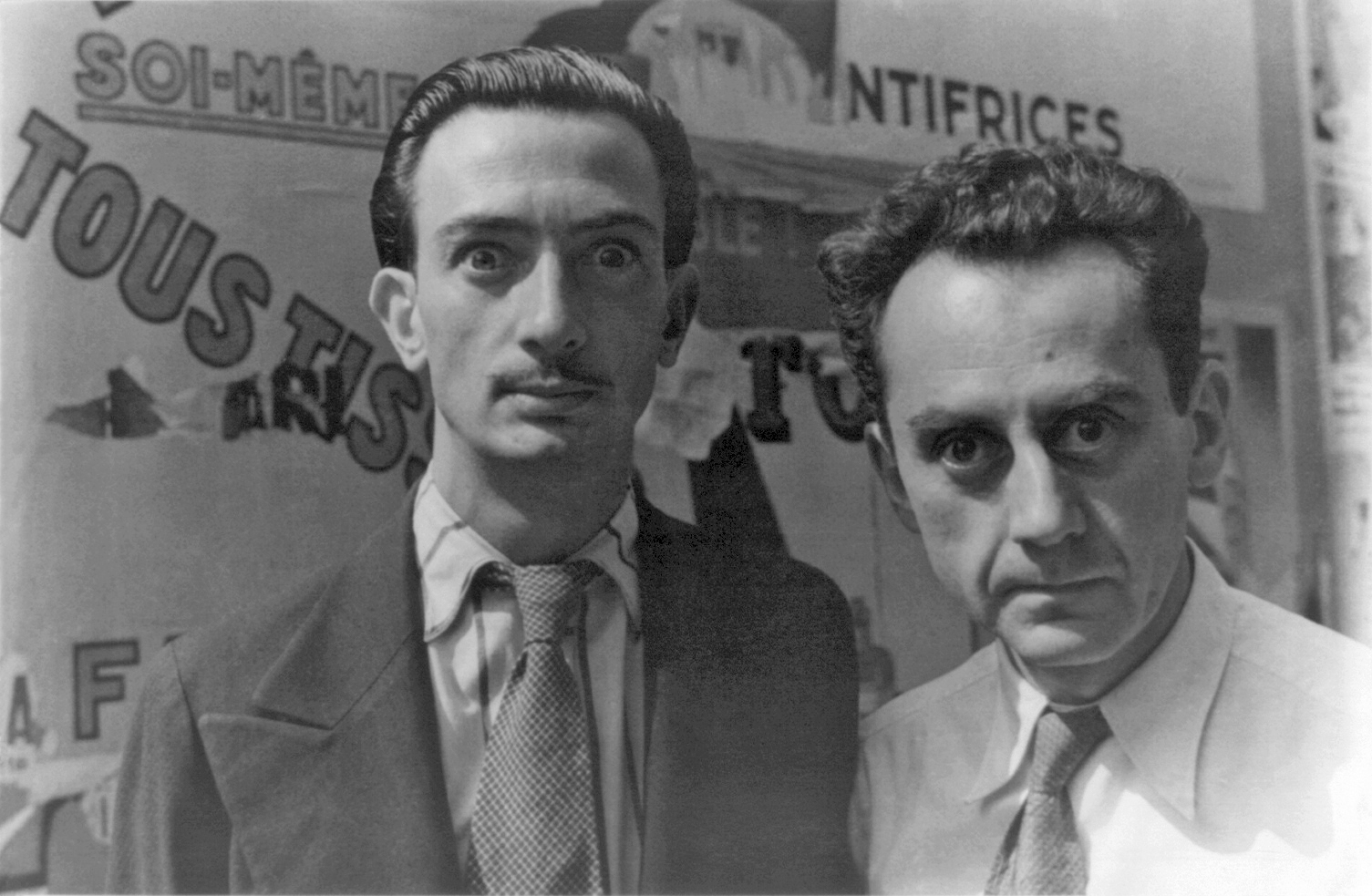
Salvador Dalí and Man Ray in Paris, on June 16, 1934, making "wild eyes" for photographer Carl Van Vechten

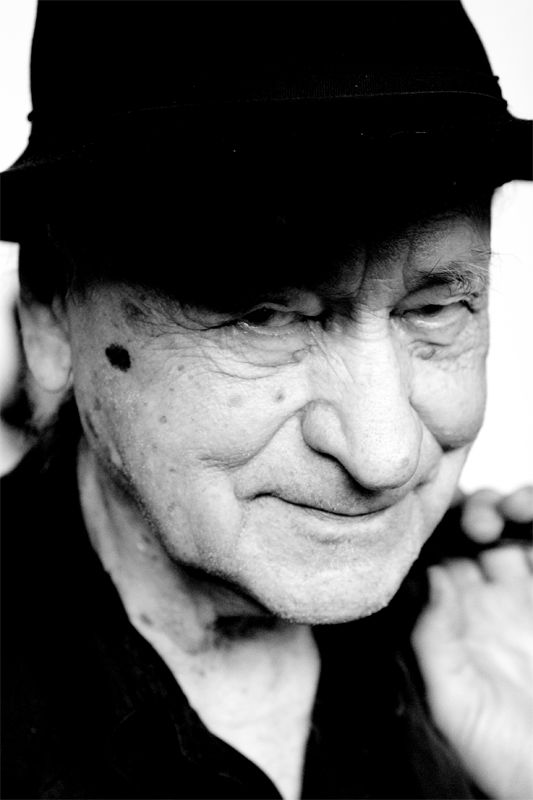
Lithuanian artist Jonas Mekas, regarded as godfather of American avant-garde cinema

- John Abraham (Indian movie director)
- Kenneth Anger (American filmmaker)
- Diane Arbus (American photographer)
- Berenice Abbott (American photographer)
- Bruce Baillie (American filmmaker)
- Craig Baldwin (American filmmaker)
- Matthew Barney (American performance artist, filmmaker, photographer)
- Timur Bekmambetov (Russian filmmaker)
- Jordan Belson (American filmmaker)
- Patrick Bokanowski (French filmmaker)
- Stan Brakhage (American filmmaker)
- Luis Buñuel (Spanish filmmaker)
- John Cassavetes (American filmmaker)
- Věra Chytilová (Czech filmmaker)
- Jean Cocteau (French poet, artist, filmmaker)
- Bruce Conner (American filmmaker, sculptor, and painter)
- Tony Conrad (American video artist, experimental filmmaker)
- David Cronenberg (American filmmaker)
- Maya Deren (American filmmaker)
- Nathaniel Dorsky (American filmmaker)
- Germaine Dulac (French filmmaker)
- Anna Eriksson (Finnish filmmaker)
- Harun Farocki (German filmmaker)
- Rainer Werner Fassbinder (German filmmaker)
- David Gatten (American filmmaker)
- Ernie Gehr (American filmmaker)
- Jean-Luc Godard (French filmmaker)
- Larry Gottheim (American filmmaker)
- Philippe Grandrieux (French filmmaker)
- Jerome Hiler (American filmmaker)
- Peter Hutton (American filmmaker)
- Ken Jacobs (American filmmaker)
- Alejandro Jodorowsky (Chilean director)
- Mary Jordan (American filmmaker, performance artist, activist)
- Jaromil Jireš (Czechoslovak filmmaker)
- Harmony Korine (American filmmaker)
- Kurt Kren (Austrian filmmaker)
- Stanley Kubrick (American filmmaker)
- Peter Kubelka (Austrian filmmaker)
- Jørgen Leth (Danish filmmaker)
- Len Lye (New Zealand filmmaker)
- David Lynch (American filmmaker)
- Jodie Mack (American filmmaker)
- Christopher Maclaine (American filmmaker)
- Robert Mapplethorpe (American photographer)
- Toshio Matsumoto (Japanese experimental filmmaker‚ video artist)
- Jonas Mekas (Lithuanian-American filmmaker)
- Otto Muehl (Austrian filmmaker)
- Dudley Murphy (Experimental filmmaker)
- Ryūtarō Nakamura (Japanese director and animator)
- Gunvor Nelson (Swedish filmmaker)
- Nikos Nikolaidis (Greek filmmaker)
- Andrew Noren (American filmmaker)
- Mamoru Oshii (Japanese filmmaker)
- Pier Paolo Pasolini (Italian filmmaker, poet and writer)
- Simone Rapisarda Casanova (Italian filmmaker)
- Man Ray (American/French, photographer and filmmaker)
- Alain Resnais (French filmmaker)
- Diana Ringo (Finnish filmmaker)
- Jacques Rivette (French filmmaker)
- Jean Rouch (Ethnographic filmmaker)
- Rudolf Schwarzkogler (Austrian filmmaker)
- Kirill Serebrennikov (Russian filmmaker)
- Jack Smith (American filmmaker)
- Michael Snow (Canadian artist, filmmaker)
- Sion Sono (Japanese filmmaker, dramatist and poet)
- Straub–Huillet (French filmmakers)
- Phil Solomon (American filmmaker)
- Léopold Survage (French artist of Russian-Danish-Finnish descent)
- Shūji Terayama (Japanese dramatist, filmmaker, poet and writer)
- Lars von Trier (Danish filmmaker)
- Andy Warhol (American artist)
- Peter Weibel (Austrian filmmaker)
- Joel-Peter Witkin (American photographer)
- Fred Worden (American filmmaker)
- Kansuke Yamamoto (Japanese photographer and poet)
- Thierry Zéno (Belgian filmmaker)

== Dancers and choreographers ==
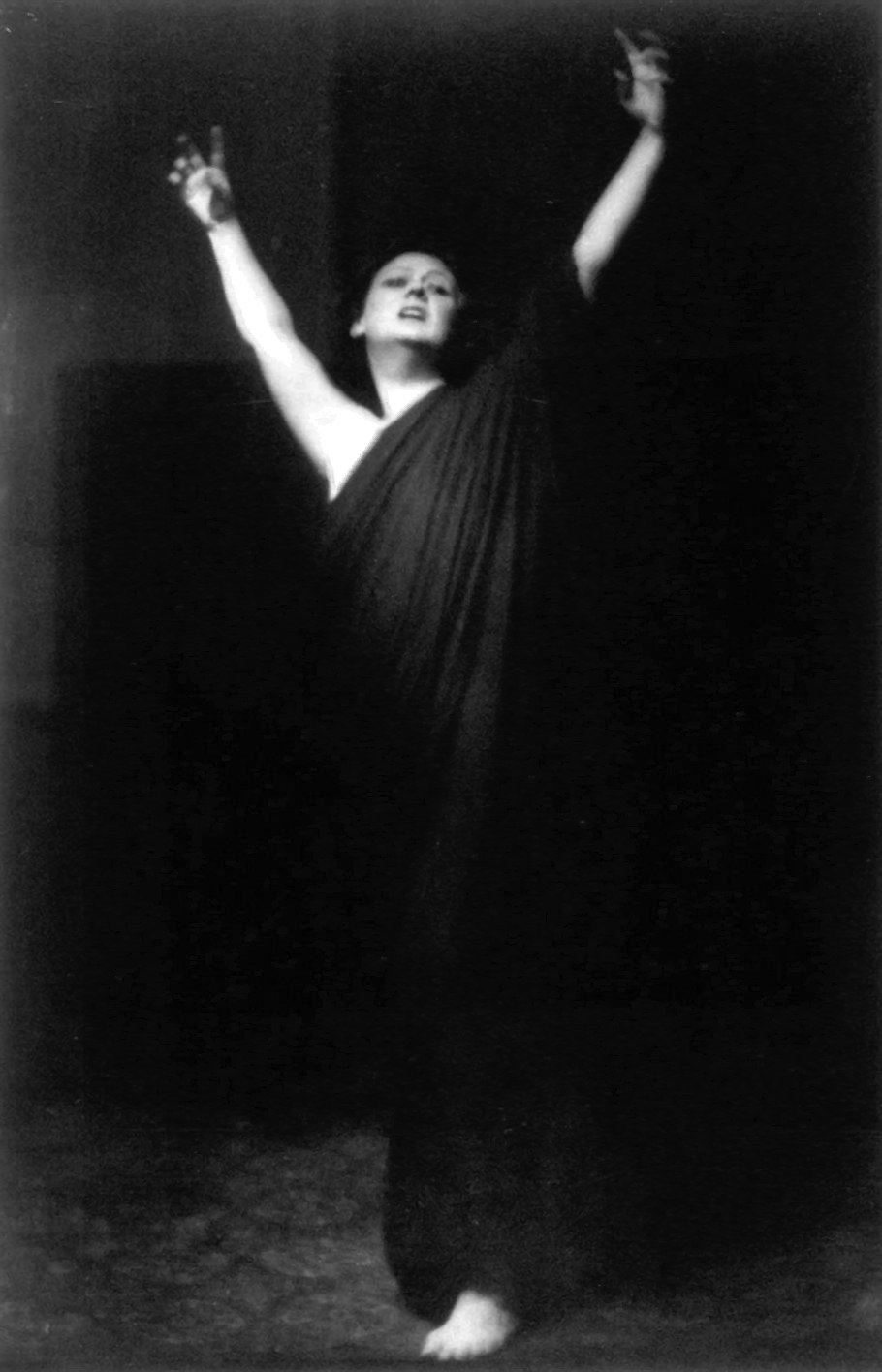
Isadora Duncan performing barefoot. Photo by Arnold Genthe ca. 1915–1918

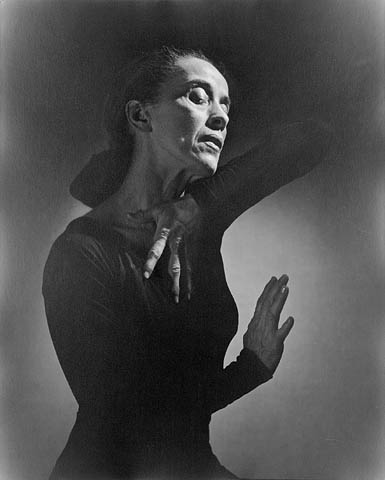
Martha Graham, photo by Yousuf Karsh, 1948

- Pina Bausch (German dancer, choreographer)
- Trisha Brown (American dancer, choreographer)
- Lucinda Childs (American dancer, choreographer)
- Merce Cunningham (American dancer, choreographer)
- Isadora Duncan (pioneer of modern dance)
- Loie Fuller (pioneer of modern dance)
- Valeska Gert (1892–1978) (German dancer)
- Martha Graham (American dancer, choreographer)
- Sally Gross (American dancer, choreographer)
- Deborah Hay (American dancer, choreographer)
- Anna Halprin (American dancer, choreographer)
- Erick Hawkins (American dancer, choreographer)
- Hanya Holm (pioneer of modern dance)
- Doris Humphrey (pioneer of modern dance)
- Léonide Massine (pioneer of modern dance)
- Vaslav Nijinsky (pioneer of modern dance)
- Alwin Nikolais (American dancer, choreographer)
- Yvonne Rainer (American dancer, choreographer)
- Ruth St. Denis (pioneer of modern dance)
- Ted Shawn (pioneer of modern dance)
- Anna Sokolow (American dancer, choreographer)
- Helen Tamiris (pioneer of modern dance)
- Twyla Tharp (American choreographer, dancer)
- Charles Weidman (pioneer of modern dance)
- Mary Wigman (German dancer, choreographer)

== Others ==
- Yuri Landman (Experimental instrument builder)

== See also ==
- Bohemianism
- Intelligentsia
- Experimental film
- Experimental literature
- Experimental music
- Experimental theatre
- Modernism
- Russian avant-garde
