= Donnarumma =

Donnarumma (Italian pronunciation: [ˌdɔnnaˈrumma]) is an Italian surname. Notable people with the surname include:

- Alfredo Donnarumma (born 1990), Italian football second striker
- Antonio Donnarumma (born 1990), Italian football goalkeeper
- Gianluigi Donnarumma (born 1999), Italian football goalkeeper
- Marco Donnarumma (born 1984), Italian performance and media artist
