= Nina Sellars =

Australian artist

- Education: PhD Monash University
- Known for: Visual Art, interdisciplinary

Nina Sellars is an artist and Research Fellow at the Alternate Anatomies Lab, School of Design & Art, Curtin University, Perth, Western Australia. Sellars describes her artwork as focused on "human anatomy and its symbiotic history with arts and technology." Sellars is also an adjunct lecturer at the Department of Anatomy & Developmental Biology, Monash University, Melbourne, Australia and the Project Manager for Immersive Environments at the School of Design & Art, Curtin University, where she designs augmented reality/blended reality teaching spaces that are informed by visual arts practice.

Sellars' installations, such as her 2009 work Anatomy of Optics and Light, aim to highlight relationships between light and the anatomical body.

Sellars' work has been featured in analyses of science-inspired artwork. Sellars has collaborated extensively with fellow artist Stelarc, as in their 2005 biomaterials installation Blender and in Oblique: Images from Stelarc's Extra Ear Surgery, which consists of Sellars' photographs of Stelarc's unusual body modification. A group exhibition that featured this piece, Art & Science: Merging Art & Science to Make a Revolutionary New Art Movement at GV Art Gallery in London, received an exhibition review in the scientific journal BMJ. She was also featured in the group exhibition Human+ at the Trinity College Science Gallery in Dublin, which was discussed in scientific journal Nature.
