= Gil Weinberg =

Israeli musician & inventor (born 1967)

Gil Weinberg גיל וינברג
- Born: 1967 (age 58–59); Jerusalem, Israel
- Genre: Experimental music
- Occupations: Musician, Inventor, Professor of musical technology
- Years active: 1991–present

Gil Weinberg (Hebrew: גיל וינברג; born 1967) is an Israeli-born American musician and inventor of experimental musical instruments and musical robots. Weinberg is a professor of musical technology at Georgia Tech and founding director of the Georgia Tech Center for Music Technology.

== Biography ==
Gil Weinberg was born in Jerusalem and began to study the piano at the age of seven. His teachers were disciplinarians who insisted on proper posture and hand position, emphasizing technique and theory at the expense of creativity. When he began composing his own music, they claimed he had no right to do so before mastering the fundamentals. His rebellion against this approach led to much of what he does today. "I'm trying to get children to be creative and expressive long before they have technique and theory," Weinberg says. "They can express themselves by pushing, pulling and other motions. Music is something you can invent and improvise with. I'm sure that this is a much better way into this world than focusing on technique and theory in the beginning."

Weinberg did his undergraduate studies in an interdisciplinary program at Tel Aviv University with a focus on musicology. He received a master's degree and PhD from MIT Media Lab.

== Robotics ==
Weinberg has developed a number of novel musical instruments for novices, such as the Beatbugs, and the Squeezables before conceiving the field of Robotic Musicianship. In 2005, he created the world first improvising robot, Haile, which can listen to human musicians, improvise and play along using a variety of musical algorithms. His next inventions were Shimon an improvising robotic marimba player that can improvise like jazz masters, and Travis (also known as Shimi), a smart-phone enabled robotic musical companion that is designed to enhance listeners musical experiences. Shimi is currently being commercialized by Tovbot Inc.

== Startups ==
In 1991, Weinberg and his partner Yigal Barkat founded a company called Sense Multimedia, which produced a CD-Rom edition of the Carta atlas, established The Third Ear website and developed one of the first karaoke software programs.

In 1994, Weinberg began working for Music Notes, where he established the multimedia division and developed products based on optic technology for reading music.

In 2007, Weinberg founded ZOOZ Mobile, a musical software company, maker of the iPhone music app ZOOZbeat. He currently serves as the CTO and chairman of the company, which produces a set of musical applications for cell phones that allow music to be created in an expressive and intuitive manner.

== Music ==
Since 2000 Weinberg has been composing for and performing with his musical instruments and robots. A partial list of his compositions include:

- 2012: The Shimi Band, (with Mason Bretan) for three robotic musical companions, premiered in Google IO, San Francisco, CA
- 2012: N-400, for a robotic marimba player and orchestra, premiered at the Ferst Center, Atlanta, GA
- 2011: Bafana, for a robotic marimba player and human marimba player, premiered at the Woodruff Arts Center, Atlanta, GA
- 2009: Shimon and ZOOZbeat, for a robotic marimba player and an iPhone application, premiered at SIGGRAPH Asia, Yokohama, Japan
- 2008: Playing With the Masters, (with Ryan Nikolaidis) for a robotic marimba player and human pianist, premiered at Digital Life Design conference, Munich, Germany
- 2007: Svobod, for perceptual robotic xylophone player, saxophone, and piano, premiered at International Computer Music Conference, Copenhagen, Denmark
- 2006: Jamaa, for perceptual robotic drum player and darbuka drums, premiered at Hamaabada, Jerusalem, Israel
- 2005: PowWow, for perceptual robotic drum player and pow-wow drum, premiered at International Computer Music Conference, Barcelona Spain
- 2004: iltur, three compositions for Beatbugs, drums, bass, brass, and piano, premiered at International Computer Music Conference, Miami, Florida
- 2002: Nerve, for 8 interconnected Beatbugs, premiered at Freies Berlin Concert Hall, Berlin, Germany
- 2001: BrainWaves Sonification, interactive electro acoustic composition, premiered at Ars Electronica, Linz, Austria
- 2000: Squeezables, an electronic composition for a squeezable instrument, premiered at Ars Electronica, Linz, Austria

== Academic career ==
Weinberg is the founding Director of Georgia Tech Center for Music Technology, where he established the M.S and PhD programs in Music Technology. He holds an associate professorship position in the School of Music and an adjunct professorship position in the School of Interactive Computing. Dr. Weinberg research aims at expanding musical expression, creativity, and learning through meaningful applications of technology. His research interests include robotic musicianship, New Interfaces for Musical Expression, mobile music, and sonification. During his tenure at Georgia Tech, he has published over 50 peer-reviewed papers, 2 utility patents, and 7 patent applications. Weinberg's music has been featured in festivals and concerts such as Ars Electronica and SIGGRAPH, and with orchestras such as German Symphony Orchestra, Berlin, the RTÉ National Symphony Orchestra, and the BBC Scottish Symphony Orchestra. His interactive musical installations have been presented in museums such as the Cooper–Hewitt, National Design Museum and the Boston Children's Museum. With his improvising robotic musicians, Haile and Shimon, he has traveled worldwide, featuring dozens of concerts and presentations in festivals and conferences such as SIGGRAPH, DLD, and the World Economic Forum in Davos.
