= Georgia Tech Center for Music Technology =

- Founder: Gil Weinberg
- Established: November 2008
- Focus: Research and development of new musical technologies for music creation, performance and consumption
- Location: Georgia Tech College of Architecture

The Georgia Tech Center for Music Technology (GTCMT) is an interdisciplinary research center housed at Georgia Institute of Technology College of Design. The Center, founded in November 2008, by Gil Weinberg focuses on research and development of new musical technologies for music creation, performance and consumption.

== Research ==
Research in the center focuses on innovative musical technologies that transform the way in which music is created, performed and consumed. Research groups include Robotic Musicianship, Distributed, Music Informatics, Mobile Music and Sonification.

== Musical Initiatives ==
GTCMT is home for a number of artistic and musical initiatives:

- The Margaret Guthman Musical Instrument Competition - an annual event focusing on identifying new ideas in musical instrument design, engineering, and performance.
- Sonic Generator - a contemporary music ensemble-in-residence dedicated to the performance and exploration of music composed, shaped, influenced, enhanced, and created by the use of technology.
- Listening Machines - An annual student concert series.
