= Ours to Destroy =

Canadian folk rock band

Ours To Destroy

Background information
- Origin: Calgary, Alberta, Canada
- Genres: folk rock
- Years active: 2004–present
- Labels: The Sound Mind Records
- Members: Steven Dodd; Eric Ewin; Roland Griffith; David Morley
- Website: ourstodestroy.com

Ours To Destroy

Studio album by Ours To Destroy
- Released: 5 February 2006
- Genre: experimental rock
- Length: 43:00
- Label: The Sound Mind Records

Professional ratings
Review scores
Source	Rating
Chart Attack	link
New Music Canada	link
CreativeLoafing.com	link
Indie-Music.com	5/5 stars

Ours To Destroy is a Canadian folk rock band from Calgary. The current line-up is David Morley, Steven Dodd, and Roland Griffith. The band's name is taken from Jeff Tweedy's reference to their music "We made it, it's ours to destroy" in the Wilco documentary I Am Trying to Break Your Heart on the making of Yankee Hotel Foxtrot.

The band formed in 2004 and released their first eponymous full-length CD Ours To Destroy in 2006. The CD has received favorable reviews for its experimental nature and exploration of genres.

Ours to destroy toured in 2008, culminating in Toronto's NXNE Festival playing at Lee's Palace with Besnard Lakes and Swervedriver.

== Discography ==
=== LPs ===
- Ours To Destroy (The Sound Mind Records, 2006)
