= Stelarc =

Cyprus-born Australian performance artist

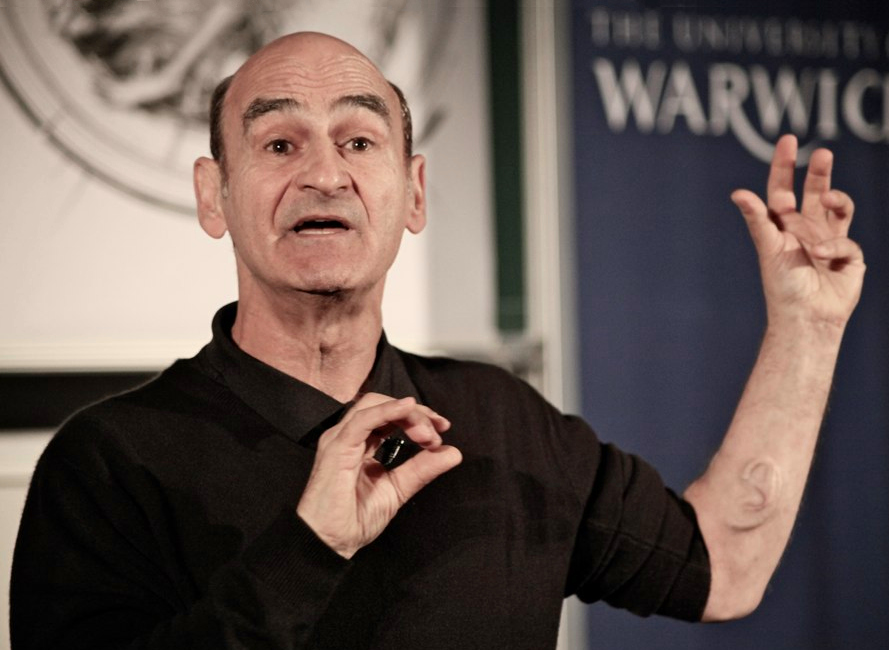
- Stelarc showing his third ear at the Warwick University in 2011
- Born: Stelios Arcadiou; 1946 (age 79–80); Limassol, Cyprus
- Known for: Performance art

Stelarc (born Stelios Arcadiou (Greek: Στέλιος Αρκαδίου) in 1946; legally changed his name in 1972) is a Cyprus-born Australian performance artist raised in the Melbourne suburb of Sunshine, whose works focus heavily on extending the capabilities of the human body. As such, most of his pieces are centred on his concept that "the human body is obsolete". Until 2007 he held the position of principal research fellow in the Performance Arts Digital Research Unit at Nottingham Trent University in Nottingham, England. He is currently furthering his research at Curtin University in Western Australia.

== Performances ==
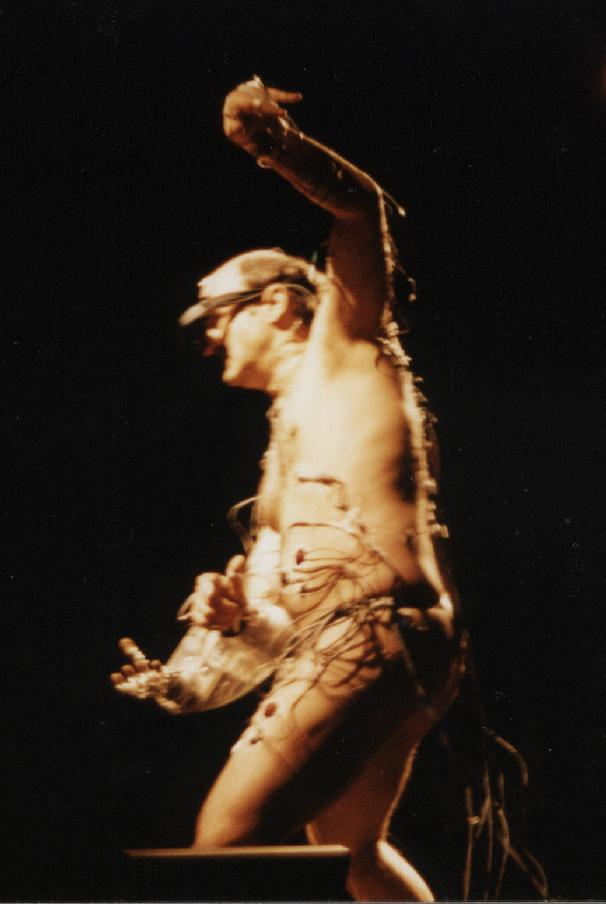
Parasite: Event for Invaded and Involuntary Body, at the 1997 Ars Electronica Festival

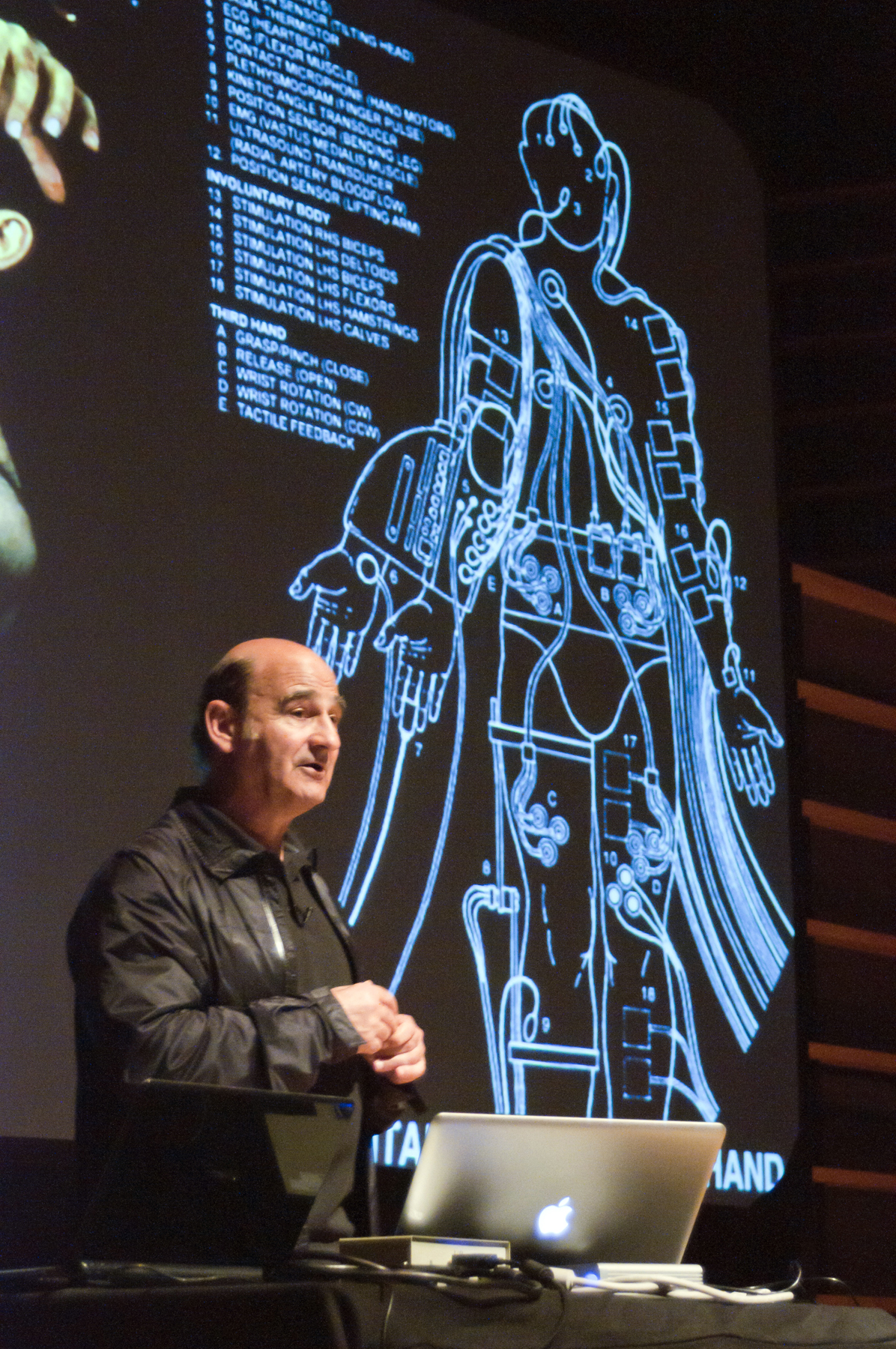
Stelarc at the Concordia University, Canada, in 2010

Stelarc's idiosyncratic performances often involve robotics or other relatively modern technology integrated with his body. In 26 different performances he has suspended himself in flesh hook suspension, often with one of his robotic inventions integrated. His last suspension performance was held in Melbourne in March 2012.

In another performance he allowed his body to be controlled remotely by electronic muscle stimulators connected to the internet. He has also performed with a robotic third arm, and a pneumatic spider-like six-legged walking machine which sits the user in the centre of the legs and allows them to control the machine through arm gestures.

In 2020, a work by Stelarc entitled Reclining Stickman, a robot sculpture operated by the artist, featured in the Adelaide Biennial of Australian Art at the Art Gallery of South Australia (AGSA). However, AGSA had to temporarily close from 25 March 2020 owing to the COVID-19 pandemic in Australia, so some of the exhibits are being shown online, along with virtual tours of the exhibition. Stelarc performed with his sculpture in real time, as well as making the videorecording available.

== Third ear ==
In 2007, Stelarc had a cell-cultivated ear surgically attached to his left arm. His longtime collaborator, fellow Australian artist Nina Sellars, photographed this body modification for her piece Oblique: Images from Stelarc's Extra Ear Surgery. Pieces by both artists were included in a group exhibition that received an exhibition review in scientific journal BMJ.

== Works ==
In 2005, MIT Press published Stelarc: The Monograph which is the first extensive study of Stelarc's prolific work. It includes images of performances and interviews with several writers including William Gibson, who recount their meetings with Stelarc. In 2016 book on Robots and Art Stelarc reflected on his own work in a chapter titled "Encounters, Anecdotes and Insights—Prosthetics, Robotics and Art".

== Awards and honors ==
- In 1995 Stelarc was awarded a three-year fellowship from the Australia Council for the Arts.
- In 1997 Carnegie Mellon University appointed him Honorary Professor of Art and Robotics.
- In 1998 he was artist-in-residence for the city of Hamburg, Germany.
- In 2000 Monash University awarded him an Honorary Degree of Laws.
- In March 2003, at The Ohio State University, he completed an artist-in-residence program.
- In 2008 he was appointed as senior research fellow and artist-in-residence, MARCS Auditory Laboratories, University of Western Sydney, Australia.
- In 2010 Stelarc received the prestigious Ars Electronica Golden Nica in the category "Hybrid Art", Linz, Austria.
- In 2024 he was elected an Honorary Fellow of the Australian Academy of the Humanities.
- In 2025 he was conferred the title of Doctor Honoris causa by the Athens School of Fine Arts, Greece.

== See also ==
- Marcel·lí Antúnez Roca
- Shu Lea Cheang
- Marco Donnarumma
- Neil Harbisson
- God helmet
- Kevin Warwick
