= Marcel·lí Antúnez Roca =

Spanish artist (born 1959)

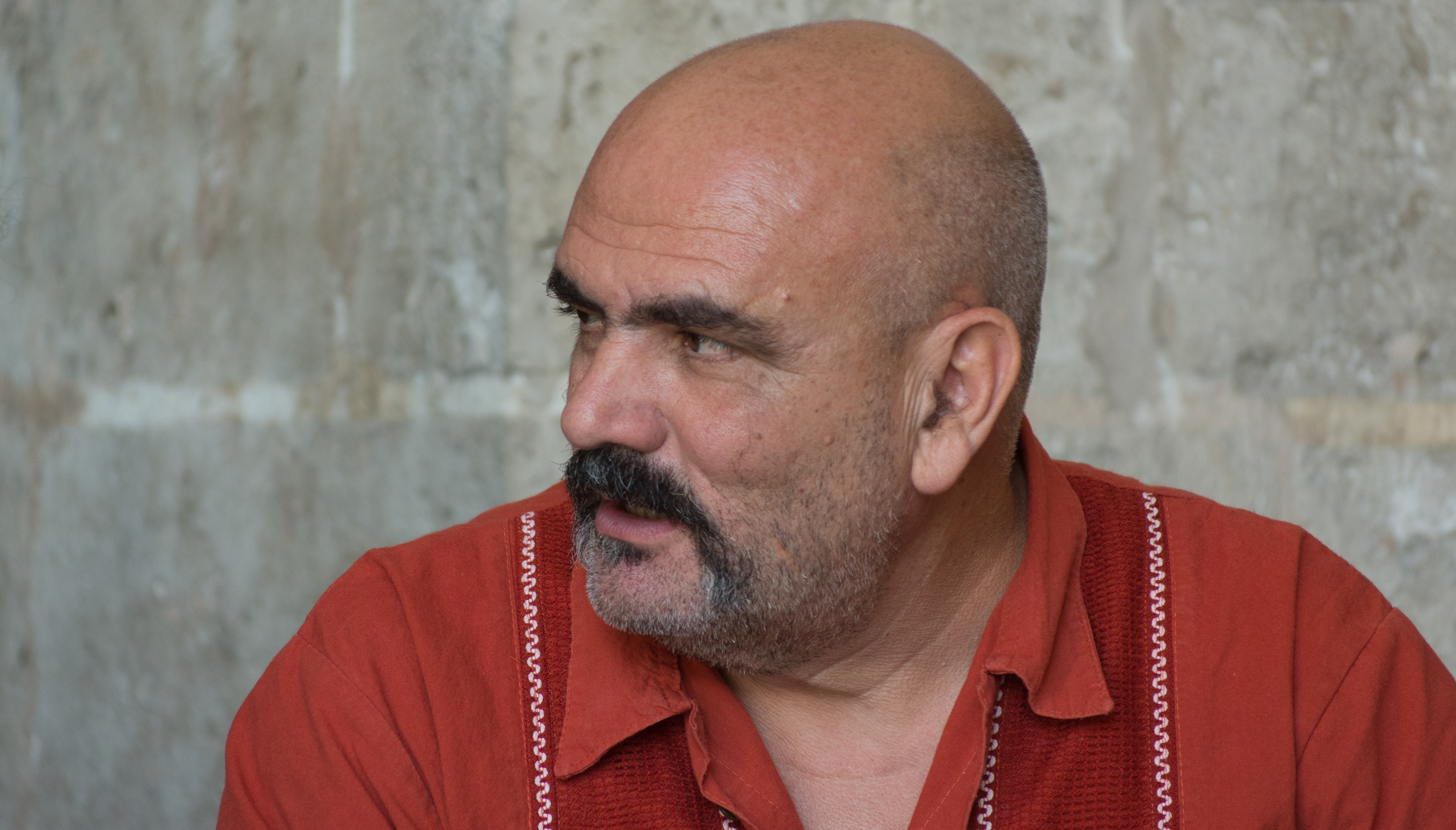
- Born: 13 December 1959 (age 66); Moià, Barcelona, Spain
- Education: University of Barcelona
- Occupation: Artist
- Known for: using digital technologies in the fields of mechatronic performance and installation art

Marcel·lí Antúnez Roca (born 13 December 1959, in Moià, Barcelona) is a Spanish artist who uses digital technologies in the fields of mechatronic performance and installation art.

== Artistic career ==
=== La Fura dels Baus (1979–1989) ===
While pursuing his studies in fine arts at the University of Barcelona, Marcel•lí Antúnez co-founded the collective La Fura dels Baus with Carles Padrissa, Pere Tantinyà, Quico Palomar, and Teresa Puig. The works of La Fura dels Baus were primarily performed on the streets of Barcelona. Town councils in the city would arrange for the group to perform in parades. He was part of the collective from 1979 until 1989 as a performer, musician and artistic coordinator in the first three performances of the group: the trilogy Accions (1984), Suz /o /Suz (1985) and Tier Mon (1988).

=== Los Rinos (1985–1992) ===
With Sergi Caballero and Pau Nubiola, he founded the group Los Rinos, initially focusing on graffiti. Later, his activity extended to painting, video action performances, concerts and wall installation, such as Rinodigestió (1987), a system of interconnected wooden and glass boxes containing decaying organic matter.

=== Solo career (1992– present) ===
Since 1992, Marcel•lí Antúnez has developed a series of works in various formats exploring biology, technology, society, and culture. Using drawing and painting as the basis of his work, he used techniques such as interactive sculpture of both organic and artificial materials, growing microorganisms, and interactive performance art incorporating cinematic elements such as animation, as well as multiple projection screens and sound systems.

=== Mechatronic performances and expanded cinema ===
- Epizoo (1994)
- Afasia (1998)
- POL (2002)
- Transpermia (2003)
- Protomembrana (2006)
- Hipermembrana (2007)
- Cotrone (2010)
- Pseudo (2012)

=== Installations ===
- JoAn, l'home de carn (1992)
- La vida sin amor no tiene sentido (1993)
- Agar (1999)
- Alfabeto (1999)
- Requiem (1999)
- Human Machine (2001)
- Metzina (2004)
- Tantal (2004)
- DMD Europa (2007)
- Metamembrana (2009)

=== Exhibitions ===
- Epifania (1999)
- Interattività furiosa (2007)
- 43 somni de la raó (2007)
- Outras peles (2008)
- Hibridum Bestiarium (2008)
- Salón de Juegos (2009)

=== Films ===
- Retrats (1993)
- Frontón. El hombre navarro va a la Luna (1993)
- Satèl•lits Obscens (2000)
- El Dibuixant (2005) IMDB file
- El Peix Sebastiano (2012)

== Terminology ==
Marcel·lí Antúnez has described his work using some unique terminology:

Dreskeleton: an active scenic component using software created by the artist for the purpose of controlling the dynamics and interactions between the different elements of scene.

Sistematurgia: dramaturgy of computer systems.

Fembrana: costumes with range, position and touch sensors embedded in latex prosthetics.

== Awards ==
- First prize in the Étrange festival (París, 1994), for Frontón
- Best New Media en Nouveau Cinéma et Nouveaux Médias (Montreal, 1999), for Afasia
- Max award to the alternative theatre (España, 2001), for Afasia
- FAD award (Barcelona, 2001), for Afasia
- Honorable Mention in Prix Ars Electronica (2003), for POL
- Ciutat de Barcelona award in multimedia (2004), for Mondo Antúnez

== See also ==
- Shu Lea Cheang
- Marco Donnarumma
- Neil Harbisson
- God helmet
- Stelarc
- Kevin Warwick

== Bibliography ==
- AAVV (2003). "POL. A Mechatronic Show". Code – Language of our time. Germany: Hatje Cantz Verlag. pp. 322–325. ISBN 3-7757-1356-5.
- AAVV (2009). Corpo automi robot. Tra arte, scienza e tecnologia. Milano: Edizioni Gabriele Mazzota. p. 305. ISBN 978-88-202-1933-8.
- AAVV (2009). "Body as technology: Techno-body Modification". Evolution Haute Couture: art and science in the post-biological age. Kaliningrad. pp. 98–99. ISBN 978-5-94620-054-7.
- AAVV (1999). Claudia Giannetti (ed.). Marcel•lí Antúnez Roca. Epifanía (Exhibition Catalogue). Madrid: Fundación Telefónica. ISBN 84-89884-10-2.
- AAVV (2011). Bonanno Editore (ed.). Marcel•lí Antúnez Roca e la performatività digitale. Roma: Gruppo Editoriale s.r.l.
- AAVV (2009). Protomembrana, Metamembrana, Hipermembrana. Un proyecto de Marcel•lí Antúnez Roca (Exhibition Catalogue). Barcelona: ACTAR. ISBN 978-84-96954-87-8.
- Dixon, Steve (2007). "Camping The Cyborg: Marcel•lí Antúnez Roca". Digital Performance. A History of New Media in Theater, Dance, Performance Art, and Installation. Cambridge-London: The MIT Press. pp. 321–327. ISBN 978-0-262-04235-2.
- VVAA (2003). "POL. A Mechatronic Show". Code – Language of our time. Germany: Hatje Cantz Verlag. pp. 322–325. ISBN 3-7757-1356-5.
- Giannetti, Claudia (2008). "Operar sobre la interfaz del cuerpo". El discreto encanto de la tecnología. Badajoz: Ministerio de Cultura. Secretaría General Técnica, Subdirección General de Publicaciones, Información y Documentación. pp. 500–501. ISBN 978-84-96933-19-4.
- Salabert, Pere (2009). El cuerpo es el sueño de la razón y la inspiración una serpiente enfurecida. Marcel•lí Antúnez Roca: cara y contracara. Murcia: Cendeac. ISBN 978-84-96898-39-4.
- Schwartzman, Madeline (2011). "Reframers". See yourself sensing. Redefining human perception. London: Black Dog Publishing Limited. pp. 12–15. ISBN 978-1-907317-29-3.
- Shanken, Edward A. (2010). "Bodies, surrogates, emergent systems". Art and electronic media. London: Phaidon. p. 153. ISBN 978-0-7148-4782-5.
- Wilson, Stephen (2002). Information arts. Intersections of art, science, and technology. Cambridge-London: The MIT Press. pp. 16–161, 455. ISBN 0-262-23209-X.
