= What's He Building in There? =

Canadian avant-garde metal band

- Also known as: WHBIT?
- Origin: Waterloo, Ontario, Canada
- Genres: Avant-garde metal progressive metal
- Years active: 2006–2010
- Label: Year of the Sun Records
- Spinoff of: Abacus
- Members: Liam Epps; Hal Jaques; Chris Schroeder; Mason Tikl
- Past members: David Halk; Chris Cookson; Aiden Stevenson; Darren Hartley
- Website: whbit.con

What's He Building in There? was a Canadian avant-garde metal band, formed in 2006 in Waterloo. The band's music combined elements of funk, avant-garde metal and progressive rock. The band, named after a Tom Waits song from Mule Variations, were known for their live show in which they usually wear outrageous costumes. They have been said to "create a sort of audio psychosis that totally envelopes and surrounds the listener like a straight jacket," and their debut album has been described as "an unlikable masterpiece."

== History ==
What's He Building in There? was formed in 2006 in Waterloo, Ontario by drummer Liam Epps, vocalist Chris Schroeder, bassist Hal Jaques, and guitarists David Halk and Chris Cookson. With the exception of Cookson, all members were previously of the band Abacus, which disbanded in 2006 (after their 2005 EP release) due to founding member, Darren Hartley, leaving the band to be with his wife and kids. The band released their debut, self-titled album under Year of the Sun Records in May 2007. The album was solely released on a Canadian independent label, and distributed throughout the US by The End Records. Following the debut of their album, the band released an avant-garde music video for the single "Avian Taxi", which has sparked interest due to the fact it takes place in Canada's largest indoor playground, Kidzone Family Fun Center, with the band dressed in many different costumes (giant lobster, gecko, chicken, and turtle) with Darren Hartley's oldest child, Xander Hartley as the main character, and Hartley himself dressed as the bear. The video premiered on the frontpage of the popular media site Heavy.com, with Heavy Canada's vice president, David U.K., stating that the company is "committed to supporting the Canadian indie music scene."

After a series of tours supporting the debut album, David Halk and Chris Cookson left to continue their education, while Halk resurfaced a few years later under the alias Hollywood Halk, but has yet to release an album. Mason Tikl (guitar) and Aiden Stevenson (bass) joined the band in March 2008 and Hal Jaques changed instruments to play guitar. In the first couple months of the new line up, the band wrote three new songs that they played on their July 2008 western Canada tour.

In September 2008, Aiden Stevenson left the band to continue his education. What's He Building in There? toured eastern Canada in October 2008, with Fredericton's We, the Undersigned. The band then moved to Montreal.

In February 2009, the band announced that they would permanently switch from a five-piece to a four-piece. Hal Jaques migrated back to his original role as bass guitarist, and Mason Tikl remained as the sole guitarist. The band toured as a four-piece during their entire coast to coast "Is That Eh?" Canadian tour from late February to mid April. From March to April 2009 WHBIT toured cross-Canada with We, the Undersigned.

In October 2009, the band toured eastern Canada once again, and for the first time including Newfoundland. They, alongside tour-mates Ninjaspy, recorded the first episode of MTV's Metal vs. Metal.

In June 2010, the band's record label, Year Of The Sun Records, signed a distribution deal with Relapse Records to expand the availability of the band's album throughout the United States of America.

The group has since disbanded. However, the members pursue other projects.

== Discography ==
- 2007: What's He Building in There? (Year of the Sun Records)

== Videography ==
- 2007 Avian Taxi
