= Marco Donnarumma =

Italian performance artist

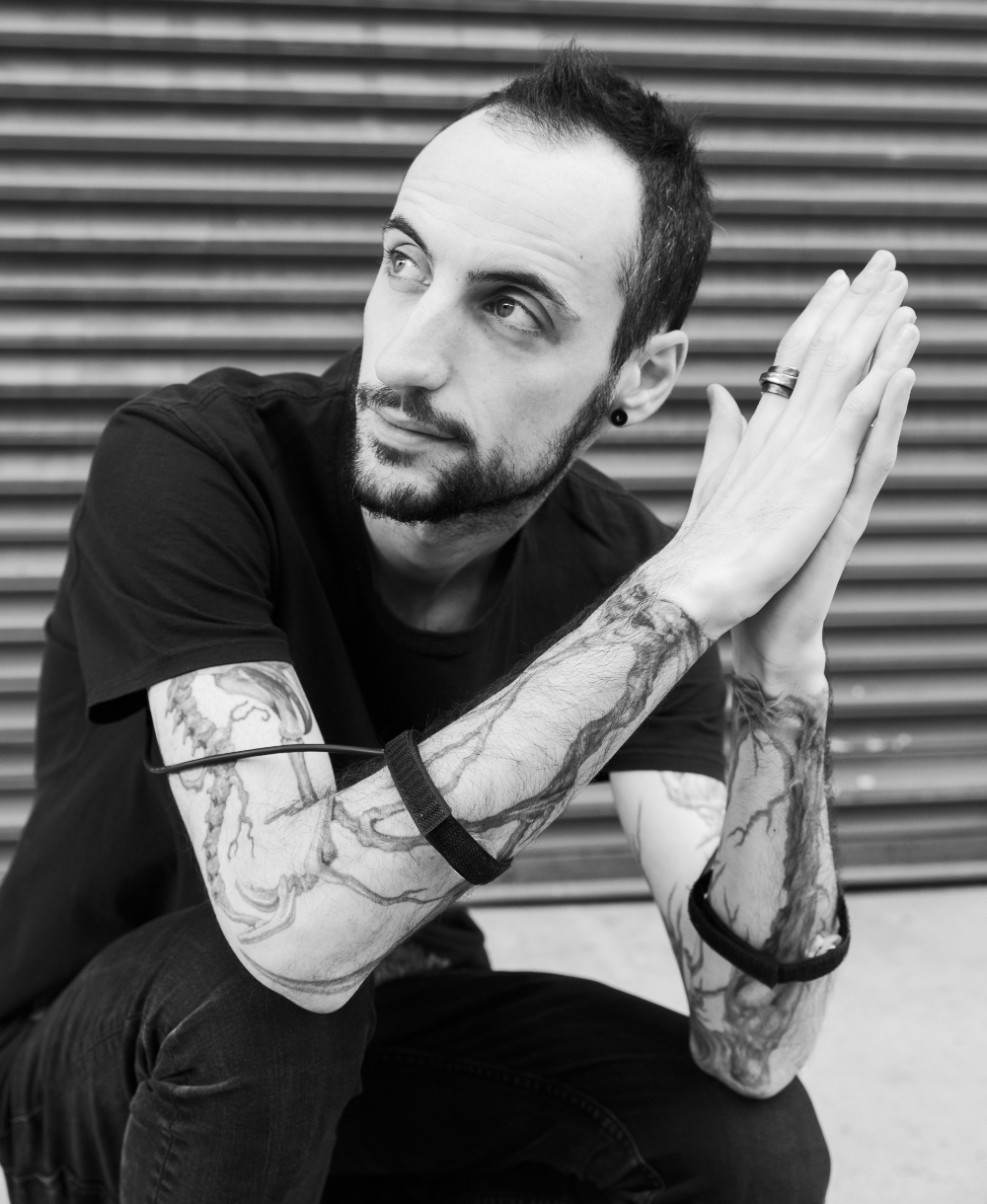
- Born: Naples, Italy
- Education: Venice Academy of Fine Arts; Edinburgh College of Art; Goldsmiths, University of London
- Known for: Performance art; Theater; Media art; Computer music
- Notable work: Hypo Chrysos (2012); Corpus Nil (2016); Eingeweide (2018); Amygdala (2015-18)
- Movement: Avant-garde
- Website: marcodonnarumma.com

Marco Donnarumma (born 1984 in Naples) is an Italian performance artist, sound artist, new media artist, theater director, inventor and theorist based in Berlin. His work addresses the relationship between body, politics and technology. He is widely known for his performances fusing sound, computation, robotics and biotechnology. He designs and builds body-related technologies, such as robotic prostheses powered by AI and musical instruments that use the body's acoustic signals to create sound. Ritual, shock and entrainment are key elements to his aesthetics. Donnarumma is often associated with cyborg and posthuman artists and is acknowledged for his contribution to human-machine interfacing through the unconventional use of muscle sound and biofeedback. From 2016 to 2018 he was a Research Fellow at Berlin University of the Arts in collaboration with the Neurorobotics Research Lab at Beuth University of Applied Sciences Berlin. In 2019, together with bioartist Margherita Pevere and media artist Andrea Familari, he co-founded the artists group for hybrid live art Fronte Vacuo. Since 2022, he is an Associate Researcher at the Intelligent Instruments Lab, Reykjavik. In 2022-2023 he was a Medienkunst Fellow at medienwerk.nrw. Donnarumma was named by Der Standard a pioneer in the field of performing arts with advanced technologies.

== Life and education ==
Donnarumma was born in Naples, Italy. Between 2003 and 2004, he studied painting at the Brera Academy of Fine Arts in Milan before moving to the Venice Academy of Fine Arts, Italy, and completing his BA in New Technologies for the Performing Arts in 2007.

He obtained a Master in sound design from the Edinburgh College of Art in 2012, and a PhD in performing arts, computing and body theory from Goldsmiths, University of London in 2016. His supervisors were performer Atau Tanaka and media theorist Matthew Fuller.

== Career ==
=== 2004–2010 ===
Originally a musician and sound designer, Donnarumma's early artworks include sound and video compositions for fixed media, web-based sound installations and participative concerts. In 2007, a collaboration with a butoh project by Latvian dance company I-Dejas created the foundations for his shift to body performance. Between 2007 and 2010, he explored hybrid forms of performance with computers and new musical instruments, playing multimedia performances with an augmented electric bass guitar, interactive software and live visuals in various configurations.

=== XTH Sense ===
In 2010, feeling increasingly constrained by the conventional ways of interacting with computers on stage, such as digital interfaces and hand-held instruments, Donnarumma began exploring wearable body technologies. In 2011, for his Master in sound design at the Edinburgh College of Art, he created the XTH Sense as a new instrument for music and body performance. The XTH Sense is a wearable electronic musical instrument that amplifies and manipulate muscle sounds (known as mechanomyogram), blood flow and bone crackles from within the human body to make music and sound effects. As a performer moves, the sounds from within the body are captured by a chip microphone worn on arm or legs. Those sounds are then live sampled using a dedicated software program and a library of modular audio effects driven by physical gestures; the performer controls the live sampling parameters by weighing force, speed and articulation of the movement.

In 2012, the Georgia Tech Center for Music Technology named the XTH Sense the "world's most innovative new musical instrument" and awarded Donnarumma with the first prize in the Margaret Guthman Musical Instrument Competition. He later released the schematic and the software of the XTH Sense to the public under open source licenses (GPL and CC similar to the ones used by the Arduino project) sparking widespread interest in the international media and the artistic scene. Since then, several artists and researchers have been adopting the XTH Sense as a creative and learning tool in different field of practice, such as dance, music, theatre and engineering.

=== 2011–2015: The Body Series ===
Donnarumma gained international recognition with a series of works entitled The Body Series, which focuses on the interaction between human body, sound and technology, and includes Music for Flesh II (2011), Hypo Chrysos (2012), Ominous (2012), Nigredo (2013) and 0-Infinity (2015). Key to the series is the new kind of human-computer interaction afforded by the XTH Sense and the other technologies developed by the artist himself, such as interactive algorithms, artificial intelligence software and psychoacoustic systems. These custom technologies allow the artist to use the human body as an instrument by amplifying human bodily sounds and capturing physiological and corporeal activity.

Aesthetically, Donnarumma's body series integrates performance art, computer music, light and sound design into surreal, intense and confrontational performances. Conceptually, they are influenced by a critical approach to technology, which emphasises the relations of machines to ritualism and body politics. These works are based on a combination of choreographed and improvised movements exploring physical tension and bodily constraint. The series marked a new step in performance and new media art, paving the way for a new, transdisciplinary form of live art known as biophysical music, and contributed to the field of human-computer interaction, by creating unconventional computing techniques to physically interface human and machine.

In Hypo Chrysos (2012), a work inspired by Dante's Inferno, Donnarumma pulls two heavy concrete blocks in a circle for twenty minutes. His blood flow, muscle sound bursts and bone crackles produced during the action are amplifyed as surround sound through an eight-channel sound system and visualized as abstract organic forms through a panoramic video projection. The extreme strain of the body is thus diffused in the space and forces the audience to participate in the performer's vexation. "This process encourages tuning in to the inner state of the other and finding resonating states in one's own body."

The interactive installation Nigredo (2012–2013) offers a private experience in a black booth. The visitor's body is fastened to a chair and wired to biosensors; the acoustic signals from her own heart, muscles and veins are captured and feed back to her body in the form of new sounds, vibrations and light patterns. Light and sound dynamics vary according to the unique properties of the visitor's body, thus providing an individual experience of the work. The feedback creates an acoustic phenomena known as standing waves inside the visitor's body thus altering self-perception, body & mind awareness and experience of the self.

=== 2015–2019: 7 Configurations ===
7 Configurations (2014–2019) is a major work cycle by Donnarumma which comprises three performances – Corpus Nil (2016), Eingeweide (2018), and Alia: Zǔ tài (2018) – and two installations, Amygdala (2017–18) and Calyx (2019). The cycle marks an important stage in Donnarumma's ongoing work into the hybridization of human and machine bodies. His practice begins to integrate his established vocabulary of interactive sound, body sensors and movement with custom-built, AI-driven robotic prostheses and long-form narrative developments. This creates a new performative language that opens his work to theater and dance, while keeping its roots in performance art and technological experimentation.

The 7 Configurations cycle investigates how technology constitutes an integral part of human identity and how it can be used to question normative representations of the body. At the same time, it proposes alternative modes of being in the world, even when these possibilities expose unsettling dimensions of human–machine relations. The cycle is born out of Donnarumma's idea of "human-machine configurations"; this describes today's combination of human bodies and machines as a complex assemblage, where the machinic and the bodily parts influence one another in ambiguous and ever-changing ways. From this idea, the works develop Donnarumma's dramaturgical and choreographic voice, while contributing to the broader engagement of theater and dance with robotics, emerging technologies and posthuman art. Donnarumma's work is discussed alongside creators such as Oriza Hirata, Marcel·lí Antúnez Roca, and Stefan Kaegi, whose practices similarly intersect robotics with contemporary theatre and performance art.

In the solo performance Corpus Nil (2016), the performer's tattooed body slowly mutates from an amorphous shape to an animal-like form by contracting and quivering as if struggling against powerful constraints. The body is wired to an artificial intelligence software which autonomously generates light and sound patterns in response to the performer's body signals. As a result, white pulsing lights illuminate the scene while synchronised computer-processed sound fill the theatre space. "The performance evokes a sense of a psychedelic and alien reality, at the border between physical and virtual." Corpus Nil received an Award of Distinction at Ars Electronica in 2017.

Donnarumma's robotic installation Amygdala features an almost anthropomorphic robot limb placed inside a computer server cabinet. The robot uses a knife to cut and sculpt a large piece of skin, as a never-ending task. AI-driven, the robot's movements are generated by biomimetic neural networks that imitate animal sensorimotor systems, allowing the machine to respond adaptively to changes in its environment, rather than following pre-programmed motion sequences. “Its aim is to learn the [...] purification ritual of skin-cutting”, a ritual practiced in different ways in the contexts of both indigenous and monotheistic religions around the world. By juxtaposing these practices with AI systems, Amygdala draws attention to the role of both ritual and technology in shaping social categorisation and body politics. Its "deep exploration of self-awareness and embodiment" makes it a "rare [work] amongst current artistic explorations of machine learning".

At the end of each exhibition, the installation produces a series of altered organic skin garments. These residues form the basis of Calyx, a collection of sculptural works created by Donnarumma from the manipulated garments.

The dancetheater performance Eingeweide was presented at the Romaeuropa Festival in 2018, where it received the Digitalive Award. Co-directed and performed by Marco Donnarumma together with the artist Margherita Pevere, the work features the two performers intertwined on the ground in an embrace that forms a large, spider-like configuration of human bodies. Their naked bodies twitch as their muscle activity is captured and transformed into shuddering sound through AI-driven algorithms. A robotic trunk – an AI-guided prosthetic – begins to move autonomously once Donnarumma places it over his face like a mask. It explores the surrounding space, attaching itself to bodies and objects. An opaque, organic mask made of bacteria-produced biofilm covers Pevere's face and slides with her body on the floor. This is made by bacteria that Pevere cultivates for her artistic practice. The performance stages an encounter between two human performers, a robotic entity and a bacterial extra-organ, unfolding a gradual process of interaction and mutual responsiveness. Rather than proposing a narrative resolution, Eingeweide shows how forms of “being together” can emerge between fundamentally different agents, human and nonhuman alike.

The ensemble stage performance Alia: Zǔ tài, created in collaboration with the choreographer Nunu Kong and premiered in Berlin and Shanghai, takes its title from the Latin alia, meaning “other” and the Chinese zǔ tài (组态), meaning “structure” or “configuration.” The performance investigates forms of embodiment in the context of contemporary AI technologies. Onstage, three performers (including actress Lingling Chen) interact with two spine-like robots equipped with artificial intelligence. “Dancers and machines thus rediscover the self and the other; they explore the new possibilities of subjectivities brought about by the increasing use of artificial intelligence.”

== Works ==
=== Solo performances ===
- Music for Flesh II (2011)
- Hypo Chrysos (2012)
- Ominous (2012-2013)
- Corpus Nil (2016) with Baptiste Caramiaux

=== Stage productions ===
- Eingeweide (2018) with Margherita Pevere
- Alia: Zǔ tài (2018)
- Ex Silens (2023-24)

=== Installations ===
- Nigredo (2012-2013)
- 0-Infinity (2015) commissioned by 4DSOUND
- Amygdala (2015-2018)
- Calyx (2019)
- The AI Prostheses (2020)

=== Live art with Fronte Vacuo ===
- ΔNFANG (2019)
- ℧R (2020)
- ΣXHALE (2021-22)
- δISSOLUTION (2023)
- ¦MPOSSIBILITY (2023)
- R∄SOLUTION (2023)

=== Collaborations ===
- [radical] Signs of Life (2013) with Heidi J. Boisvert and Double Vision
- The Moving Forest (2012) by Shu Lea Cheang and Martin Howse

=== Web-based and participative installations ===
- High Spheres (2007–2010)
- Golden Shield Music (2009)
- The Invisible Suns Project (2010)

=== Early video and performance works ===
- In-Side (2004)
- 6 Giugno 1999 (2004)
- Risveglio n.1 Venezia (2005)
- I C::ntr::l Nature (2007–2010)

== Collaborations ==
Donnarumma collaborated with a range of artists across disciplines including performance art, cyberart, spatial sound, and live cinema. In 2012, together with cyberfeminist artists Francesca da Rimini (of VNS Matrix collective) and Linda Dement, Donnarumma performed in the 12-hour saga The Moving Forest, conceived by new media artists Shu Lea Cheang and Martin Howse. The work expanded the last 12 minute of Kurosawa's adaptation of Shakespeare's Macbeth, Throne of Blood (1957), into a sonic performance saga. In 2014, he collaborated with computer science researcher Baptiste Caramiaux to create a new work, Septic, commissioned by transmediale festival's Art Hack Day. In 2015, the spatial sound collective 4DSOUND commissioned him a new monumental work, 0-Infinity, which premiered at TodaysArt Festival in The Hague within the program Circadian. In 2016, he collaborated with experimental filmmaker Vincent Moon in a series of live shows during the Michelberger Music event in Berlin.

== Main exhibitions ==
Donnarumma's work has appeared in numerous exhibitions and festival worldwide including, among the others, Venice Biennale (Venice), Steirischer Herbst (Graz), ZKM Center for Art and Media (Karlsruhe), Sónar+D Advanced Music Festival (Barcelona), ISCM World Music Days (Antwerp), ISEA International Symposium on Electronic Art (Albuquerque), Electronic Language International Festival (São Paulo), RPM: Ten Years of Sound Art in China (Shanghai), Laboratorio Arte Alameda (Mexico City), La Gaîté Lyrique (Paris), Némo International Biennal of Digital Arts (Paris), transmediale Festival for Art and Digital Culture (Berlin), CTM Festival for Adventurous Music and Art (Berlin).

== Awards and distinctions ==
Selected awards include:

- 2021 : Magic Machine Award, First Prize in Art Category. RosyDX, C. Rockefeller Center, Netzwerk Medien Kunst and Technische Sammlungen.
- 2018 : Romaeuropa Festival, First Prize in Digital category.
- 2018 : Prix Adami, First Prize for Performing Arts, Bains Numériques Biennial.
- 2018 : Prix Adami, First Prize of the Press Jury, Bains Numériques Biennial.
- 2018 : Wissenschaftsjahr Preis for Art and Science, Federal Ministry of Education and Research (Germany) and Wissenschaft im Dialog.
- 2017 : Prix Ars Electronica Award of Distinction in Sound Art.
- 2016 : Berlin University of the Arts Research Fellowship.
- 2014 : CynetArt Award for Computer Based Art, Transmedia Hellerau.
- 2014 : TransitioMX Award for New Media Art, Centro Nacional de las Artes.
- 2012 : Margaret Guthman New Musical Instrument Competition, Georgia Tech Center for Music Technology.
- 2012 : Creativity + Technology = Enterprise Fellowship, Harvestworks and The Rockefeller Foundation.
- 2012 : Alt-w Festival Award, New Media Scotland.
- 2010 : Golden Shield Music & The Invisible Suns Project, Finalist, Screengrab New Media Art Award.

== See also ==
- Stelarc
- Marcel·lí Antúnez Roca
- Shu Lea Cheang
- Neil Harbisson
