= The Age of A.I. =

American science documentary web series

- Genre: Science documentary
- Presented by: Robert Downey Jr.
- Narrated by: Robert Downey Jr.
- Composers: Roahn Hylton; Jacob Yoffee
- Country of origin: United States
- Original language: English
- No. of seasons: 1
- No. of episodes: 8

Production
- Executive producers: Robert Downey Jr. Susan Downey; Sean Foley; Tom Lesinski; Cory Lanier; Derik Murray; Jenna Santoianni; Emily Barclay Ford
- Producers: Network Entertainment; Sonar Entertainment; Team Downey
- Cinematography: Steven Holleran
- Running time: 30–45 minutes

Original release
- Release: December 19, 2019 – January 15, 2020

The Age of A.I. is an eight-episode American science documentary television series narrated and hosted by American actor Robert Downey Jr. The show covers the applications of artificial intelligence (AI) in various fields, like health, robotics, space-travel, food, disaster-prevention, and others. Each 30-45 minute episode covers several different areas of AI implementation under one broader topic.

== Episodes ==
Each episode opens with a short scene of Robert Downey Jr., in which he frames the topic of the episode. Each episode then covers several related topics in separate parts, usually returning to the first topic during the final section of the episode.

No.	Title	Original release date
1	"How Far is Too Far?"	December 18, 2019
Part 1: Soul Machines is a company that works on creating lifelike simulations of humans using AI. Soul Machines and their CEO, Mark Sagar, created BabyX, a fully simulated baby, which is based on Sagar's real-life daughter. Soul Machines gets in contact with the popular musician will.i.am and offers to create an artificial version of him. Part 2: Gil Weinberg is a robotics scientist specializing in music, who created multiple musical AI inventions, including Simon, a robot that can play music. He also created a mechanical hand called the Skywalker Hand, that can provide a full range of finger motion for those missing arms. Weinberg works with Jason Barnes and Jason Schneider, musicians who are both missing limbs, to test the Skywalker Hand, which works well during the episode. Part 3: Soul Machines reveals their artificial version of will.i.am. will.i.am is impressed by the artificial version of himself, though he does believe it still sounds robotic, which he clarifies is a good thing.
2	"Healed through A.I."	December 18, 2019
Part 1: Tim Shaw was a prominent football player who was diagnosed with Amyotrophic lateral sclerosis (ALS). At this point, Shaw’s ALS has progressed to the point where he relies on his parents for physical support and speaks with a speech impediment. Part 2: Project Euphonia is a project created by Google that aims to create speech recognition for people with speech impediments. This is done through the use of AI that learns people's speech patterns. Part 3: AI is being used in India to scan people’s eyes as a part of the Diabetic Retinopathy project. The AI scans close pictures of at-risk people’s eyes and can detect certain features that could lead to blindness. Part 4: Tim Shaw meets with the people working on Project Euphonia to see if they can use speech recognition to recognize his voice. The speech recognition understood all the phrases Shaw spoke that it was pre-trained on and understood some other phrases as well. The members of Project Euphonia then revealed that they also created a technology that could mimic Shaw’s voice before his ALS diagnosis, which Shaw and his family thoroughly enjoyed.
3	"Using A.I. to build a better human"	December 18, 2019
Part 1: Jim Ewing is a rock climber who had chronic pain in his leg after a rock-climbing accident. He reconnected with an old roommate of his, Hugh Herr, who lost both of his legs in a rock-climbing accident. Herr created his own prosthetic legs using AI that makes decisions through neurological signals. Ewing decided to have his leg with chronic pain willingly amputated to try Herr’s new technology. Part 2: Pit Row, is an AI program that analyzes when stock cars should come in for a pit stop in a race. The episode covers an example of Pit Row being used in a race, in which it is able to guide a car to pit stops at the correct time. Part 3: Quake Technologies created an AI-powered tool, called C-THRU, which allows firefighters to “see” while in buildings with too much fire and smoke. C-THRU uses AI to predict where physical objects will be in smoke. Part 4: Ewing goes rock-climbing to try out a prosthetic leg Herr created for him. The first prosthetic leg breaks during the climb, but the second one works for the rest of the duration of the climb.
4	"Love, art and stories: decoded"	December 18, 2019
Part 1: Realbotix is a company that creates life-size human dolls for companionship. Realbotix teams up with an AI specialist to create technology that will allow the dolls to talk to the humans they are with. The dolls can also read human emotions to know how a person is feeling. Part 2: Oscar Sharp is a film director who creates movies using movie scripts that are entirely written by AI. Sharp feeds human-written movie scripts into a machine learning program that he calls Benjamin, and then creates movies based on the movies scripts Benjamin outputs. He always follows exactly what is in the script. The episode covers their newest movie, Bobo and Girlfriend, which is based on more human-written action movie scripts. Part 3: Roborace is a company that is trying create to driverless race-cars. Roborace invites the Technical University of Munich and Team Arrival to create AI to drive their driverless car. Both teams had varying levels of success in the challenges created by Roborace.
5	"The 'Space Architects' of Mars"	January 15, 2020
Part 1: NASA hosts a 3D-Printed Habitat Challenge, a competition for people to create model habitats using AI. The goal of the challenge is to create a machine powered by AI that could build a habitat on Mars without the help of humans. The habitats would then be ready for humans before they even got to Mars. The episode follows AI Space Factory, one of the teams in the competition, and their battle against another team from Penn State in the finals. Part 2: The Netherlands is using AI-powered greenhouses to grow plants. The greenhouses use AI to measure the health of the plants, as well as machines powered by AI that can grow and harvest the plants without the help of humans. Part 3: Back at the 3D-Printed Habitat Challenge, AI Space Factory are unable to get the top of their habitat attached, as they run out of time. However, they perform better in the crush test, where a machine attempts to crush the habitat, and they go on to win the competition because of it.
6	"Will a robot take my job?"	January 15, 2020
Part 1: TuSimple is a company that is trying to create driverless eighteen-wheeler trucks to compensate for the truck driver shortage. Maureen Fitzgerlad is a seasoned truck driver who works with TuSimple to do test runs of a truck powered by AI. The truck performs fairly well on the test run in the episode, but is often confused by the Age of AI’s camera truck. Part 2: The Port of Long Beach in California is the first fully automated container terminal in the United States. The Long Beach Container Terminal team discusses how in their field, AI does not eliminate jobs, it just creates newer, safer jobs. Part 3: RoboHub is a robotics and AI team at the University of Waterloo. They are working to create robots that can function in unstructured environments, like homes. Part 4: Zume Pizza is a pizza chain that uses AI to predict how many ingredients they will need for making pizzas every day. This prevents them from having the massive amount of waste other pizza places do. They also use AI and robotics to physically make the pizza.
7	"Saving the world one algorithm at a time"	January 15, 2020
Part 1: The Maasai Mara reserve in Kenya has a serious problem with poachers killing elephants for their tusks. The reserve decides to implement a new technology developed by Intel called TrailGuard AI, which is an AI that will analyze pictures from cameras to detect poachers. In a test, TrailGuard AI can identify humans in the reserve, even at night. Part 2: NotCo is a Chilean food company that creates plant-based alternative products to animal-based foods. NotCo uses AI to better understand the composition of food and then can recreate it. In order to test the food, they have famous chef Sergio Barroso taste the food, and then cook with it. The guests at his restaurant are amazed by how close the food tastes to the real thing. Part 3: AI is being used to predict earthquakes along the Cascadia subduction zone in California. AI can separate the vibrations caused by activities like construction and transportation from actual incoming earthquakes, which allows California to better predict earthquakes. Part 4: Descartes Labs is a company that uses AI to analyze satellite images to predict future famines and wars. They discuss how their technology could prevent tragedies in the future.
8	"How A.I. is searching for Aliens"	January 15, 2020
Part 1: The Search for Extraterrestrial Intelligence (SETI) Institute's goal is to find alien life. The SETI Institute decides to implement AI in the search for alien life. The SETI Institute uses the Allen Telescope Array to collect radio waves from space, which an AI then goes through to search for anomalies. Part 2: Sanctuary AI is a company that is trying to create an AI-powered robot that is identical to a human. The robot is modeled after Suzanne Gilbert, the founder of Sanctuary AI. The employees of Sanctuary AI discuss how they used 3D printing to mimic the anatomy of a human and how they use cameras implanted in the robot to detect and read different human emotions through the use of AI. Part 3: The final part of the episode cuts back to the SETI Institute, where they look at the findings from the Allen Telescope Array. The findings suggest that there may have been an anomaly that occurred while receiving radio waves, though it will take more time to find out if that is true. The series concludes by discussing all the applications of AI presented in the episodes.

== Interviews ==
- Alexander Werner
- Andy Petree
- Austin Dillon
- Ayanna Howard
- Bran Ferren
- Brandon J. DeHart
- Cathy Ewing
- Chelsey Crisp
- Chris Dunning
- Colin Hodges
- Danny King
- Dimitri Kanevsky
- Eric Warren
- Erik Brynjolfsson
- Fernando G. Vieira
- Gil Weinberg
- Guile Lindroth
- Holly Watson Nall
- Hugh Herr
- Jason Barnes
- Jason Schneider
- Jessica Mega
- Jim Ewing
- Johannes Betz
- John Hennigan
- John Shaw
- Julie Cattiau
- Katelyn Thorpe
- Kirk McKinzie
- Lav Varshney
- Lily Peng
- Mark Sagar
- Martin Ford
- Masie Kuh
- Matt McMullen
- Max Kumskoy
- Michael Brenner
- Omër Haciömeroglu
- Oscar Sharp
- Osric Chau
- Pedro Domingos
- R. Kim
- Rana el Kaliouby
- Ross Goodwin
- Sam Cossman
- Shanti
- Sharon Shaw
- Tim Shaw
- will.i.am

== Production ==
=== Development ===
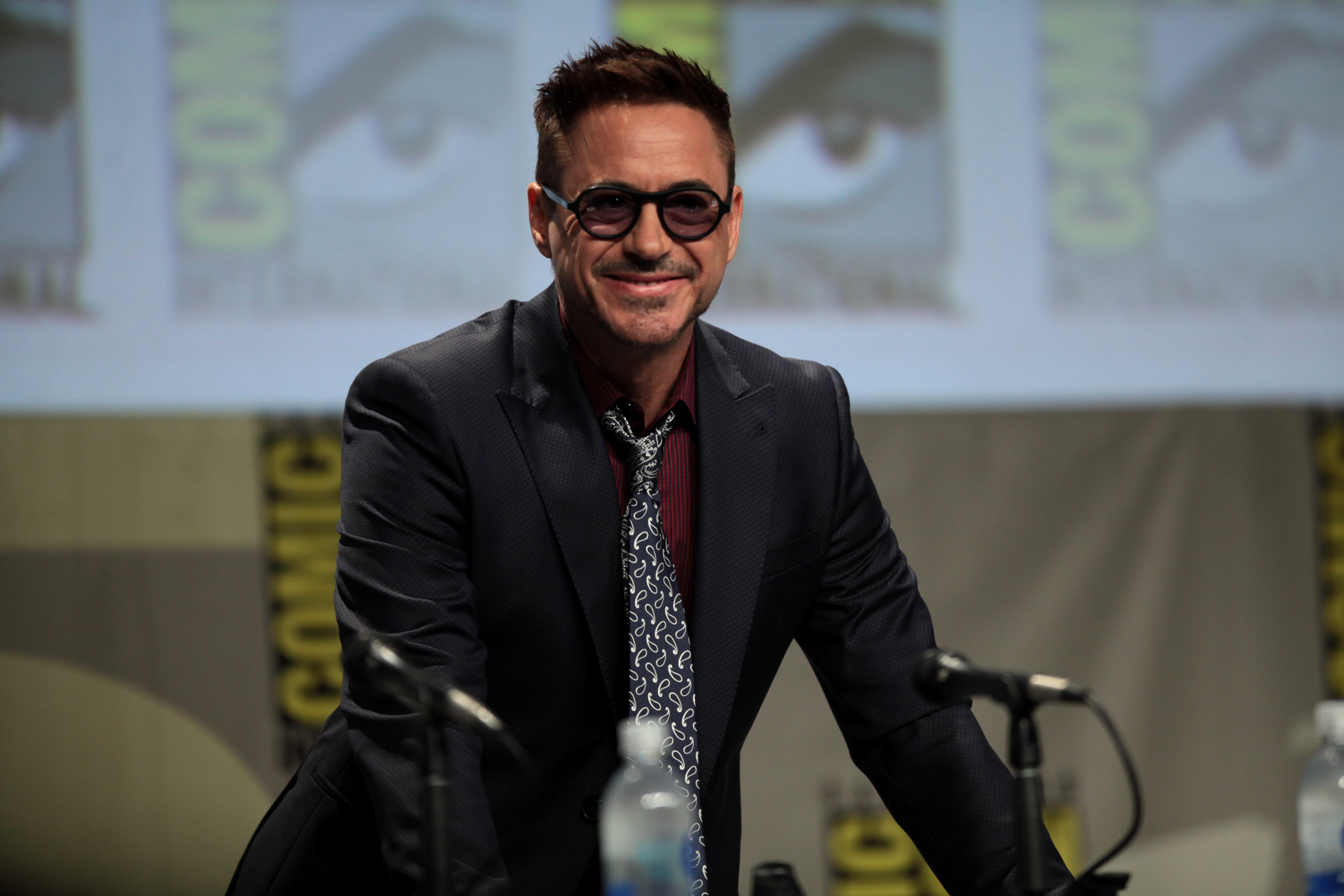
Commentators drew parallels between Robert Downey Jr. and his role as Tony Stark in the Marvel Cinematic Universe.

The series was developed by the production companies Team Downey, Sonar Entertainment, and Network Entertainment. The episodes were released in two batches for YouTube Premium users, with the first four being released on December 18, 2019 and the latter four being released on January 15, 2020. The episodes were made available for non-YouTube Premium subscribers with a new episode being released each week, starting on December 18, 2019.

=== Casting ===
Upon announcement of the series, multiple commentators noted the parallels between Robert Downey Jr.'s role in The Age of A.I., and his portrayal of Tony Stark in the Marvel Cinematic Universe (MCU) media franchise. In both roles, Downey is associated with advanced technology that is used to enhance human life. These sources also noted the coverage of AI in the MCU, in which Stark accidentally helped create Ultron, an AI villain.

== Reception ==
In an article from Decider's "Stream It Or Skip It" series, they claim that you should stream the show. They also write that the show is a good watch for anyone over the age of ten who is interested in AI. Common Sense Media gave the show four out of five stars, and said it was appropriate for those eleven years and older.
