= Theaitre =

Artificial intelligence centered research project

Theaitre (stylized as THEaiTRE) is an interdisciplinary research project investigating to what extent artificial intelligence is able to generate theatre play scripts. The first theatre play produced within the project, AI: When a Robot Writes a Play, premiered online on February 26, 2021.

== Goal ==
Following similar previous projects such as Sunspring, a short sci-fi movie with an automatically generated script, the THEaiTRE project investigates whether current language generation approaches are mature enough to generate a theatre play script that could be successfully performed in front of an audience. The project falls within the area of generative art, famously represented e.g. by the portrait of Edmond de Belamy which was generated by an artificial neural network. In this field, artists are trying to use automated techniques to create "art", questioning the modern definition of art itself.

More broadly, the project aims at promoting cooperation rather than competition of humans and artificial intelligence as the more beneficial approach for both.

The first theatre play created within the project, titled AI: When a Robot Writes a Play, was presented in February 2021 at the 100th anniversary of the premiere of the R.U.R. theatre play by the Czech author Karel Čapek to celebrate the invention of the word "robot". While R.U.R. was a play written by a human about robots (and humans), THEaiTRE tried to reverse this idea by presenting a play written by a "robot" (artificial intelligence) about humans (and robots). The script of the play was published online, with marked parts of the text which were written manually or manually post-edited. The analysis shows that 90% of the script is automatically generated, with 10% manually written or manually post-edited.

The project also plans to produce a second play in 2022, addressing some of the many shortcomings of the approach used to generate the first play, as well as attempting to further minimize the amount of human influence on the script.

== Approach ==
At the core of the project is the GPT-2 language model by OpenAI with various adjustments motivated by the task of generating theatre play scripts, for which the model is not particularly trained.

The GPT-2 model is used in the usual way, providing it with a start of a document and prompting it to generate a continuation of the document. Specifically, the input for GPT-2 in this project is typically a short description of the scene setting, followed by a few lines to introduce the characters and start the dialogue. The model then generates 10 continuation lines, and hands control to the user, who can then either ask the model to continue generating, or make various edits before letting the model to generate further, deleting some parts of the script or adding new lines into the script.

The adjustments include restricting the generator to only produce lines pertaining to characters appearing in the input prompt, limiting the repetitiveness of the generated text, and employing automatic summarization of the input prompt and the generated text to overcome the limitation of the GPT-2 model which only attends to the last 1,024 subword tokens.

The limitations of the model include, among other, a lack of distinctiveness and self-consistency of the characters, an inability to generate the script for the whole play (scripts for individual scenes are generated independently), and errors due to the employment of automated machine translation, as GPT-2 generates English texts but the final play script is being produced in Czech language.

The source codes of the project are available under the MIT licence. The project has also published some sample outputs.

== Team ==
The project is a cooperation of the following experts, all based in Prague, Czech Republic:

- computational linguists from the Faculty of Mathematics and Physics, Charles University
- theatre experts from the Švanda Theatre and from the Theatre Faculty of the Academy of Performing Arts in Prague
- hackers from CEE Hacks

The project is financially supported by the Technology Agency of the Czech Republic.
