= Faculty of Mathematics and Physics, Charles University =

- Matematicko-fyzikální fakulta Univerzity Karlovy
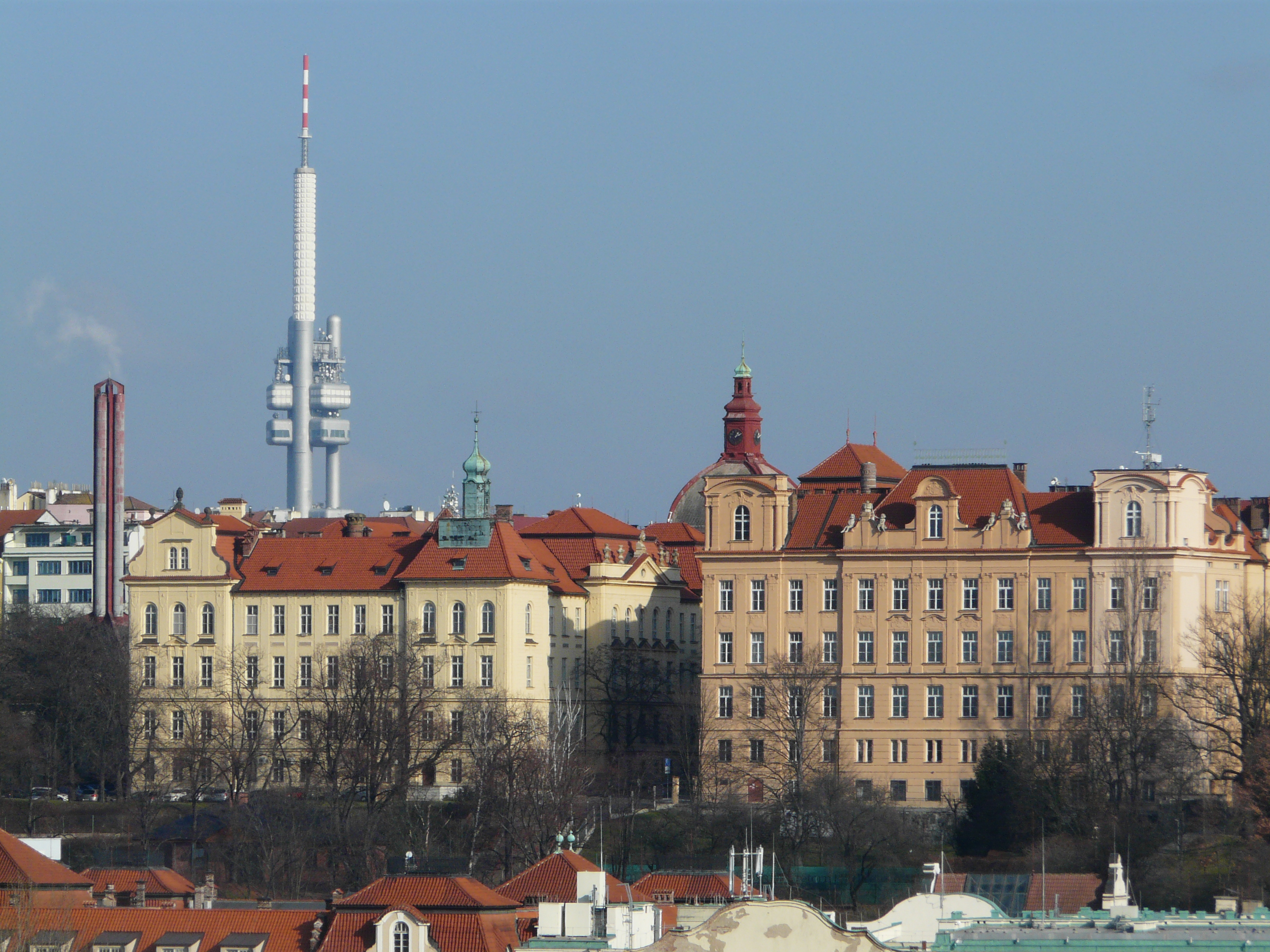
- Buildings "F" and "M"
- Latin: Facultas Mathematica Physicaque, Universitas Carolina
- Other names: Matfyz
- Established: 1952
- Parent institution: Charles University
- Dean: doc. RNDr. Mirko Rokyta, CSc.
- Location: Prague, Czech Republic; 50°5′18.13″N 14°24′13.79″E
- Website: www.mff.cuni.cz/en

Location: Prague, Czech Republic

The Faculty of Mathematics and Physics of Charles University (Czech: Matematicko-fyzikální fakulta Univerzity Karlovy or Matfyz) was established on September 1, 1952, in Prague, Czech Republic. Since that time, the faculty has been represented by its students and professors both at home and abroad.

== Activities and achievements ==
Among the recent collaborations belongs a participation in the development of the Solar Wind Analyser/Proton and Alpha Sensor (SWA-PAS) onboard the Solar Orbiter spacecraft, launching an educational game project based on comics simulations called Czechoslovakia 38–89 in cooperation with The Faculty of Arts and subsequent developing of a PC game Attentat 1942, making an AI translator called CUBBITT, which can compare to professional English human translators, establishing of the Malach Center for Visual History or the collaborating on a project dealing with AI system called DeepStack, which defeated professional poker players in 2016.

Moreover, The Faculty of Mathematics and Physics is a birthplace of Bird Internet routing daemon, IP routing daemon running mainly on Linux/UNIX-like operating systems etc., which began as a school project. Additionally, Matfyz also stood by a student project called Xelfi, which evolved in the Java integrated development environment known as NetBeans. The Faculty of Mathematics and Physics has been also among teams of The CERN Experimental Programme for a long time and the participation in the programme is guaranteed for both the academic employees and the students. In 2021, the cooperative team of Matfyz, Švandovo divadlo and DAMU worked on the first theatre play written by AI, which had its premiere on the February 26, 2021.

The faculty produces approximately 25% of all research outputs of Charles University.

== Alumni/Graduates ==
Notable graduates of Matfyz are for example astronomer Jiří Grygar or scientist Jiří Bičák, who was awarded by the Neuron Fund for his contribution to global science in 2014. In 2007, a minor planet 55844 Bičák was named after him. Further, Martin Klíma, a co-founder of a video-game developer Warhorse Studios known for a game Kingdom Come: Deliverance. Alice Valkárová, a former student and current professor of physics at Matfyz, was appointed as a member of the European Research Council (ERC) in 2021. Miloslav Feistauer, who is currently teaching at Matfyz as well, is a member of Learned Society of the Czech Republic uniting significant Czech scientists.

== Departments ==
- School of Physics
  - Astronomical Institute of Charles University
  - Institute of Physics of Charles University
  - Laboratory of General Physics Education
  - Department of Physics Education
  - Department of Surface and Plasma Science
  - Department of Physics of Materials
  - Department of Low Temperature Physics
  - Department of Condensed Matter Physics
  - Department of Macromolecular Physics
  - Department of Geophysics
  - Department of Chemical Physics and Optics
  - Institute of Particle and Nuclear Physics
  - Department of Atmospheric Physics
  - Institute of Theoretical Physics
- School of Computer Science
  - Department of Software and Computer Science Education
  - Department of Applied Mathematics
  - Department of Distributed and Dependable Systems
  - Department of Software Engineering
  - Department of Theoretical Computer Science and Mathematical Logic
  - Network and Labs Management Center
  - Institute of Formal and Applied Linguistics
  - Computer Science Institute of Charles University
- School of Mathematics
  - Department of Algebra
  - Department of Mathematics Education
  - Department of Mathematical Analysis
  - Department of Numerical Mathematics
  - Department of Probability and Mathematical Statistics
  - Mathematical Institute of Charles University

== Photos ==
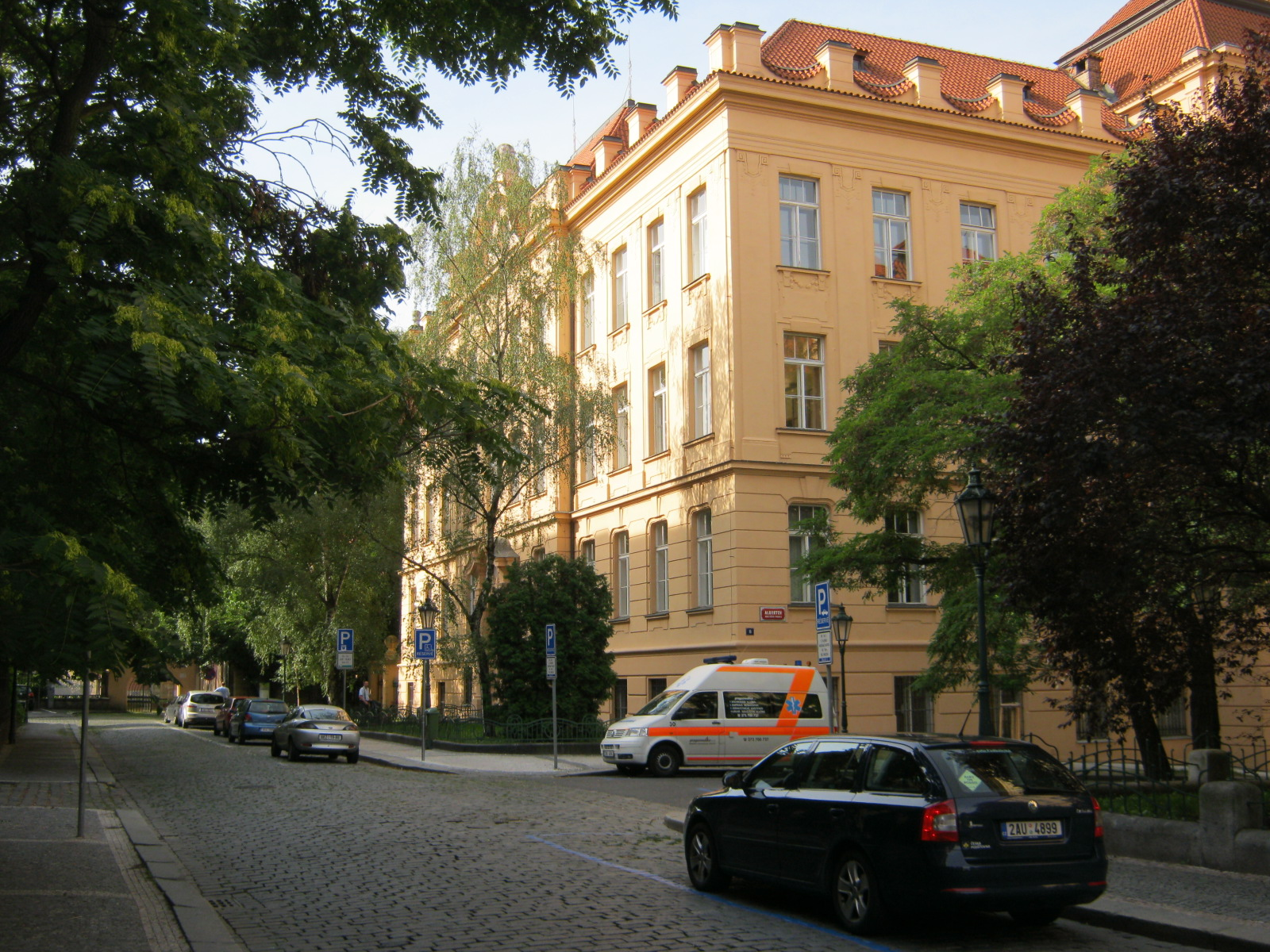
Karlov - Dean's Office

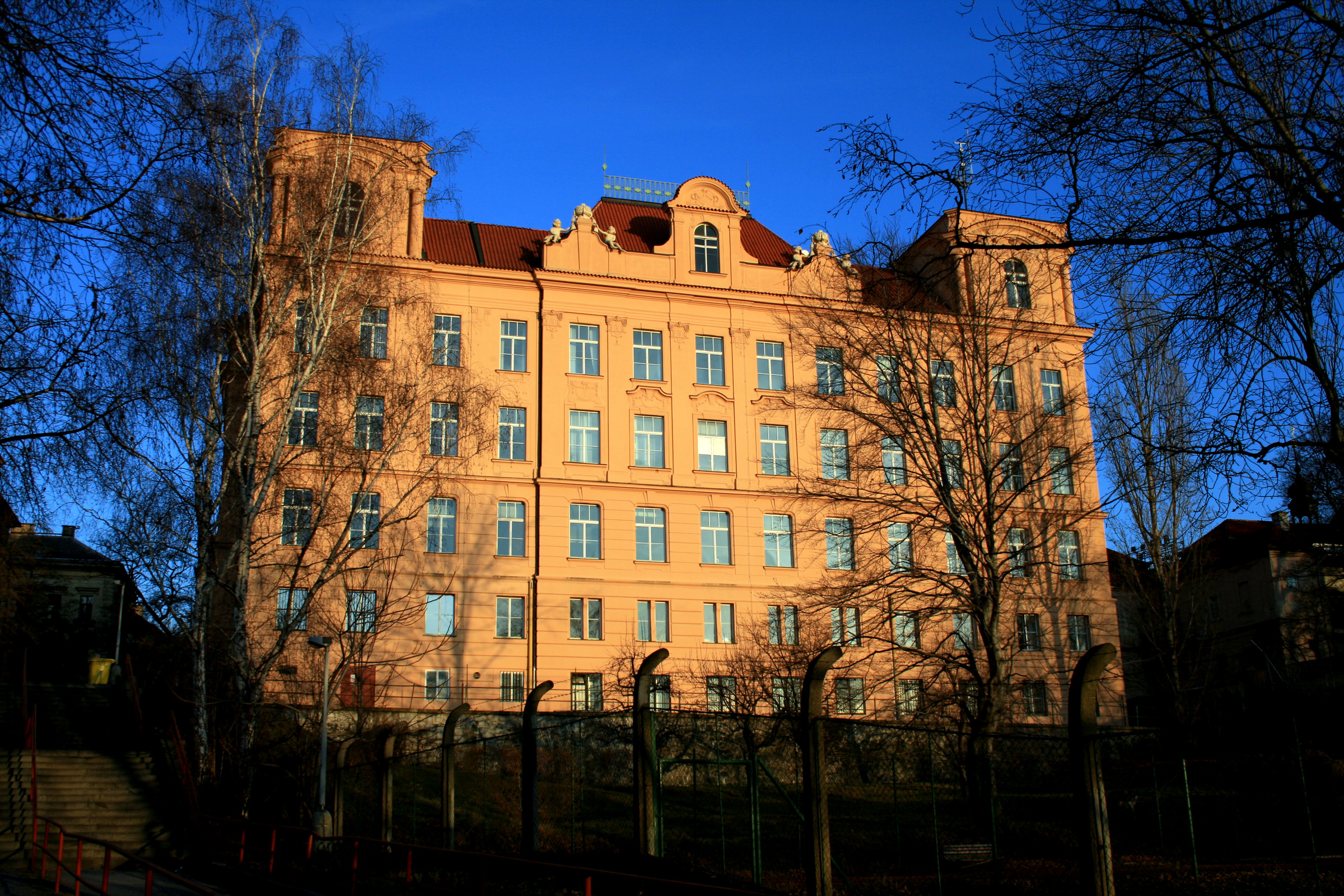
Karlov - School of Physics

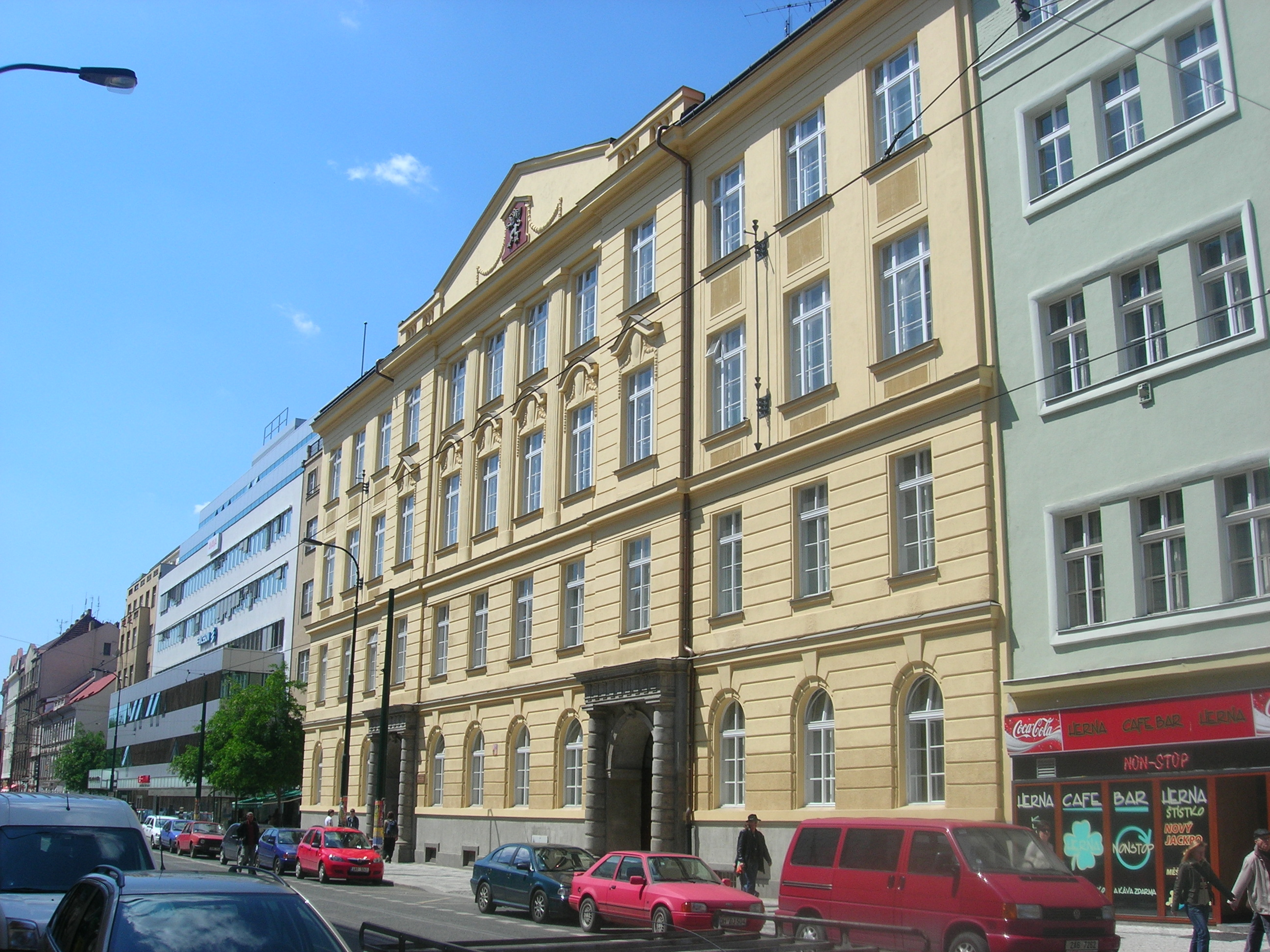
Karlín - School of Mathematics

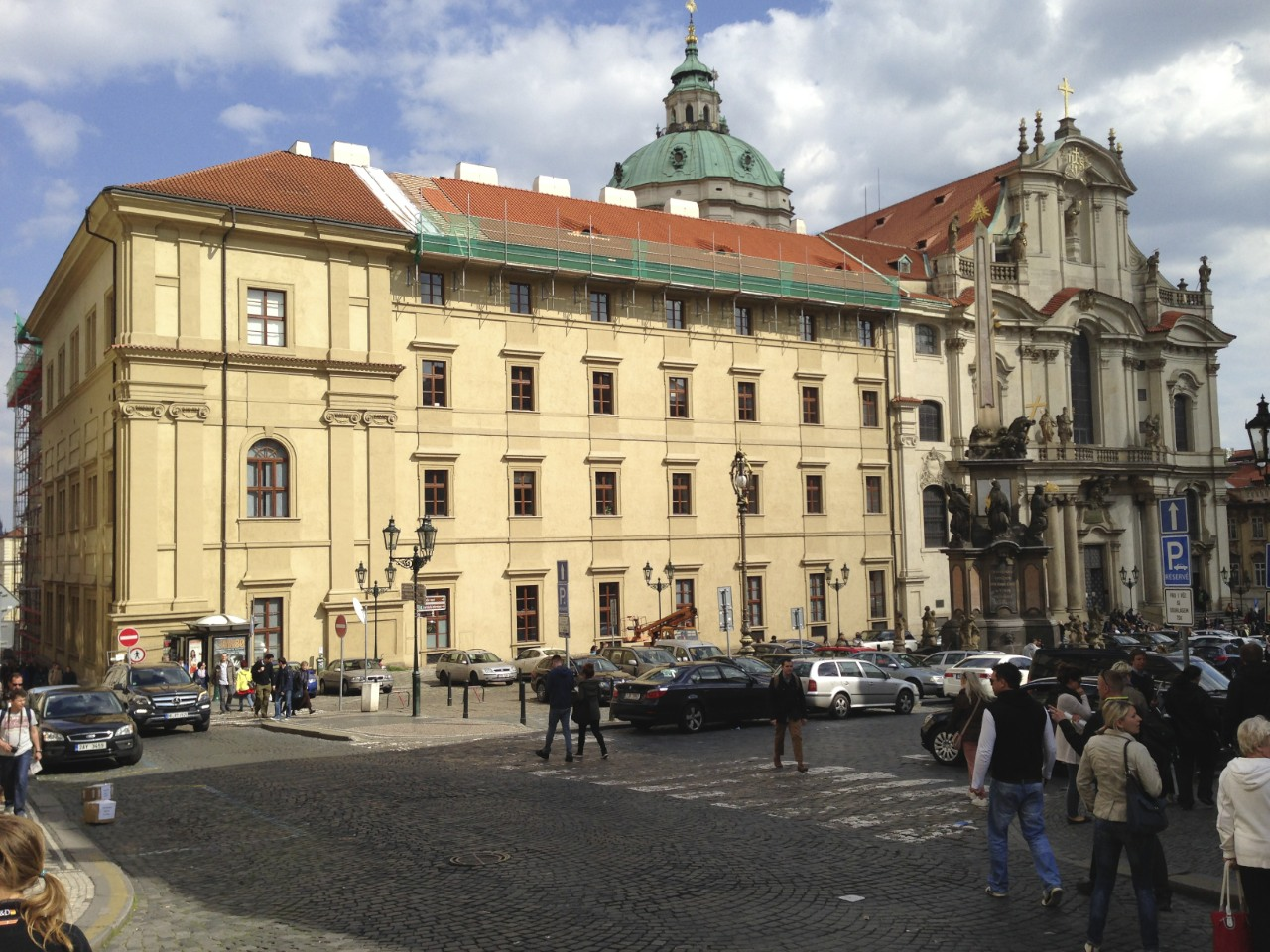
Malá Strana - School of Computer Science

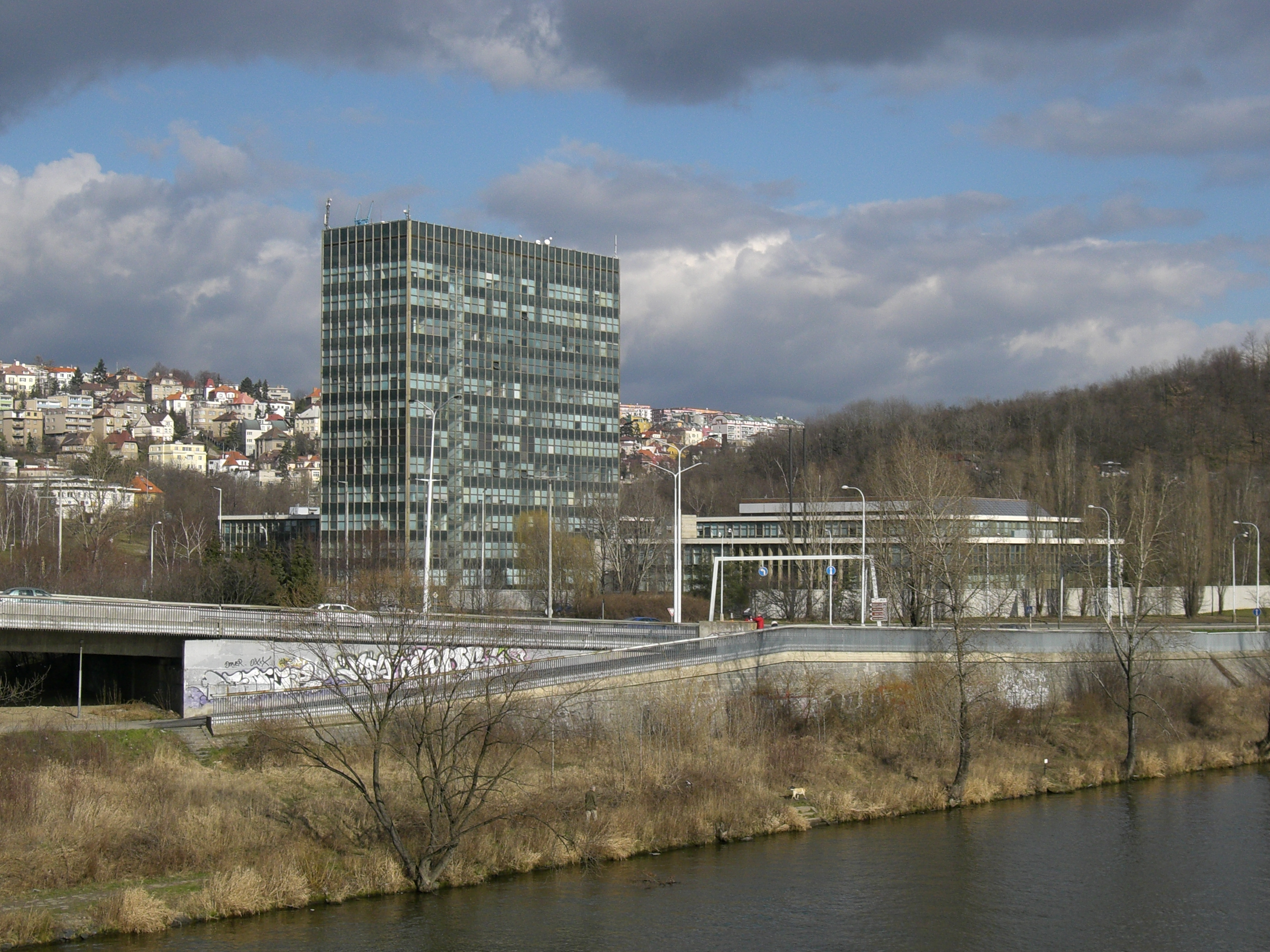
Troja - School of Physics
