= AI: When a Robot Writes a Play =

Experimental theatre play

AI: When a Robot Writes a Play (in Czech: AI: Když robot píše hru) is a 2021 experimental theatre play, where 90% of its script was automatically generated by artificial intelligence (the GPT-2 language model). The play is in Czech language, but an English version of the script also exists.

== Creation ==
The play is the first result of the THEaiTRE research project, aiming to commemorate the centenary of the R.U.R. play by Karel Čapek by investigating to what extent artificial intelligence could be used to create theatre play scripts.

The script of the play was created using the THEaiTRobot tool, based on the GPT-2 language model. First, the play dramaturge, David Košťák, described the initial setting of each scene in a few sentences, and wrote the first line for each character. Next, THEaiTRobot suggested a continuation of the script, which the dramaturge could use, reject, or use part of it and let the tool generate a new continuation. Another option was to manually insert another line or a scenic remark. The script was generated in English and was automatically translated to Czech by the state-of-the-art CUBBITT machine translation tool. The resulting script was then further post-edited by the dramaturge.

The resulting script was made freely available for non-commercial use both in English and in Czech, with marked manually inserted texts and manual edits. The analysis shows that 90% of the English script is automatically generated, with 10% manually written or manually post-edited. In the Czech script, a larger amount of edits were made, but the analysis claims that these additional edits are corrections of errors of the automated translation and stylistic corrections which do not change the meaning of the lines as represented by the English script, but rather bring the Czech script closer to the English one.

== Characters ==
The play contains 9 characters. The Robot appears in all the scenes, while each of the other characters appears in only one scene.

- Robot – The lead character, a male humanoid robot.
- Master – An old man, the creator of the Robot.
- Boy – A schoolboy.
- Masseuse – A sex worker in a brothel.
- Stranger – An engineer.
- Man.
- Psychologist.
- Administrator – A female clerk at an employment agency.
- Actress – A film actress and a model in a robot-like costume.

== Plot ==
The play is composed of 8 scenes. It tells the story of a humanoid robot, who encounters 8 other characters and engages into various typically human situations and activities, related to death, love, sex, violence, etc. The individual scenes are not tightly linked, but there are some linking points, such as the central character of the robot or some repeated and developing themes, such as the robot's search for love.

The scenes often contain some absurd turns and it is often hard to find sense in them. It is therefore a very complicated piece interpretationally, requiring the director and the actors to invest a lot of effort and creativity in finding a meaningful interpretation which would not deviate from the script. In the interpretation by Švanda theatre, who premiered the play and who also participated on the creation of the script, the scenes typically contain non-verbally expressed content which can add a lot to the meaning of the scene compared to what is contained in the actual script (as the script only contains the lines said by the characters).

=== Scene 1: Death ===
The play opens by the Robot parting with his dying Master. The Master gives the Robot several last lessons and talks with him about death, soul, and love.

=== Scene 2: Sense of Humour ===
In the second scene, the Robot meets a sad and angry Boy, who complains that he wants to go to school, that his girlfriend is crazy, that he wants to buy a car, etc. The Robot tries to help the Boy by giving him advice, but the Boy's reactions are quite negative and irritated. The Boy then repeatedly asks the Robot to tell him a joke; the Robot keeps refusing, but ultimately tells the following joke: When you are dead. When your children are dead. When your grandchildren are dead, I will be still alive.

=== Scene 3: Nightclub ===
The Robot wants to feel pleasure, so he goes to a "night club" (a brothel), where he meets a "Masseuse" (a prostitute). The Robot is initially "a bit cold", but eventually manages to enjoy the experience and falls in love with the Masseuse.

In the Švanda theatre performance, the Robot and the Masseuse seem to have a sort of virtual sex without touching each other, reminiscent of the sex scene in Demolition Man.

=== Scene 4: Fear of the Dark ===
It is the night. The Robot is standing under a lamp, unable to move away from the light as he finds that he is afraid of the dark. He meets a Stranger, an engineer who tells him that robots don't have feelings and that people cannot be trusted, and keeps hurting him.

In the Švanda theatre performance, the Man repeatedly zaps the Robot with some kind of electric pulse.

=== Scene 5: Killer Robot ===
A Man approaches the Robot and repeatedly asks him to kill him. Instead, the Robot sticks a finger into the Man's anus, which leads to an argument between the Man and the Robot.

=== Scene 6: Burn Out ===
The Robot meets a Psychologist, who keeps asking him lots of questions regarding his life, burnout feeling, love, relationships, and emotions. They also talk about the Robot using a device called emotion machine which helps him to get rid of stress.

=== Scene 7: Search for Job ===
The Robot comes to an employment agency. He meets an Administrator and asks her to help him find a job. He expresses the wish to become an actor, and talks about his experience as a clown. He reveals his name to be Troy McClure, which is a character from The Simpsons who is an actor.

In the Švanda theatre performance, the Administrator starts to seduce the Robot once his name is revealed, which he keeps ignoring; the Administrator then becomes irritated.

=== Scene 8: Love at First Sight ===
The Robot meets a human Actress in a robotic costume and falls in love with her immediately. The Actress is first reluctant, but the Robot manages to seduce her and she also falls in love with him. The Robot tells her about a binary world, in which he lives and where he will also take her. Ultimately, the Actress agrees, and the whole play concludes by the Robot and the Actress promising each to other to always be together.

In the Švanda theatre performance, the Robot does not have a physical body in this scene, we can only hear his voice and see a pulsating light (based on the line in the script where the Robot says: "I have no body. So I don't need to wear clothes. You can't see me, you only hear me."), and the Actress eventually also agrees to lose her physical body so that she can be with the Robot forever.

== Theatrical performances ==
The play premiered on 26 February 2021 in Švanda Theatre in Prague, Czech Republic, directed by Daniel Hrbek. Due to the COVID-19 pandemic, the play was not played in front of a live audience, but it was broadcast online, in Czech language with English subtitles. The play was followed by a panel discussion by the project members and experts on artificial intelligence. The premiere was viewed by 13,498 spectators worldwide. A short trailer of the premiere is available on YouTube.

In 2021, after the opening of the theatres in the Czech Republic to spectators, the play can be viewed at Švanda Theatre. The performance takes approximately 60 minutes, and is followed by a discussion of the creators with the audience. The derniere is planned for 4 February 2023.

== Reception ==
The play received a number of reviews, both in its country of origin as well as internationally. It is praised as first of its kind, although some reviewers note the similarity to previous works, such as the musical Beyond the Fence, the play Lifestyle of the Richard and Family, or the short movie Sunspring; however, these works used less advanced technology, and either were very short (Sunspring) or necessitated a larger amount of human interventions. The reviewers note that the script is far from perfect, with many inconsistencies and nonsensical parts, and conclude that the technology is definitely not yet ready to replace human authors; however, some find some parts of the script frighteningly human-like. The amount of human intervention is a somewhat controversial topic, with some reviewers finding the human influence too large (especially in interpreting the script and putting the play on scene), while others feel that a greater amount of human intervention would have been favorable as this could greatly improve the quality of the play.

The reviews also frequently comment on the amount of sex, violence and strong language in the play; this can be attributed to the method used for creating the script, where the GPT-2 language model reflects topics and language common in the human-written articles on the internet that were used to train the model. Furthermore, some reviews criticize the female characters, which can be viewed as stereotyped and sexualized objects to some extent.
