= Geek Picnic =

Science and technology festival

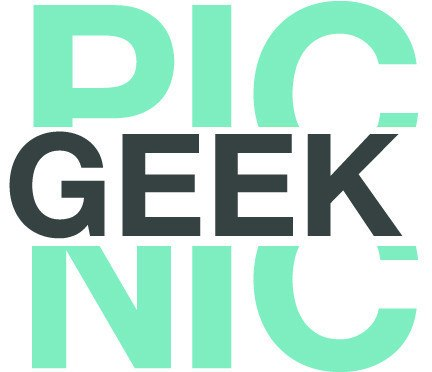
- Genre: Science and technology festival
- Frequency: Annually
- Locations: St. Petersburg, Moscow, Jerusalem
- Years active: 2011 - present
- Inaugurated: 2011
- Founder: Exponenta.me
- Website: http://geek-picnic.me

Geek Picnic is the largest European open air festival dedicated to popular science, modern technology, science and art.

The first festival was held in St. Petersburg in 2011. Since 2014, Geek Picnic has been held in Moscow and St. Petersburg. In 2016, the first Geek Picnic was held in Israel.

== Festivals ==
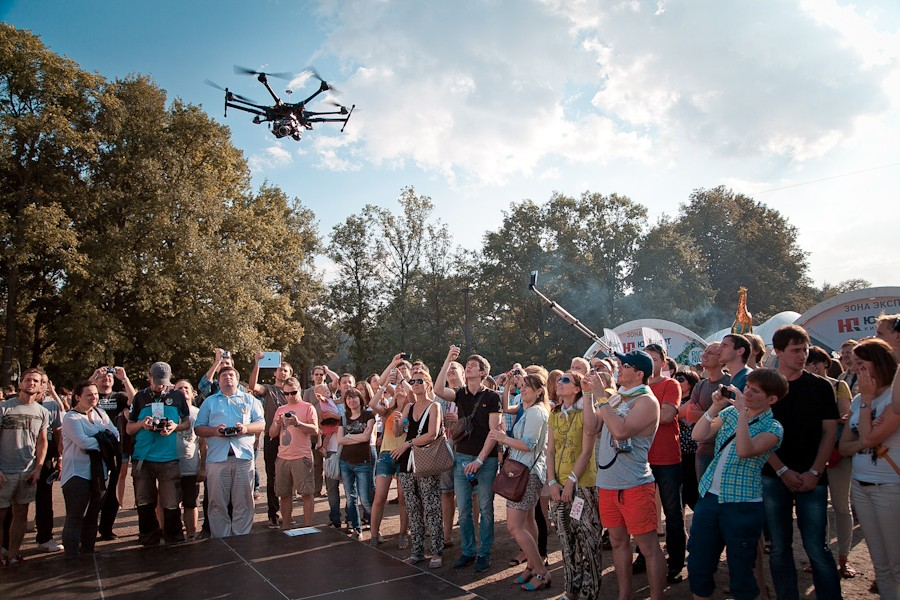
Quadcopters show, 2013

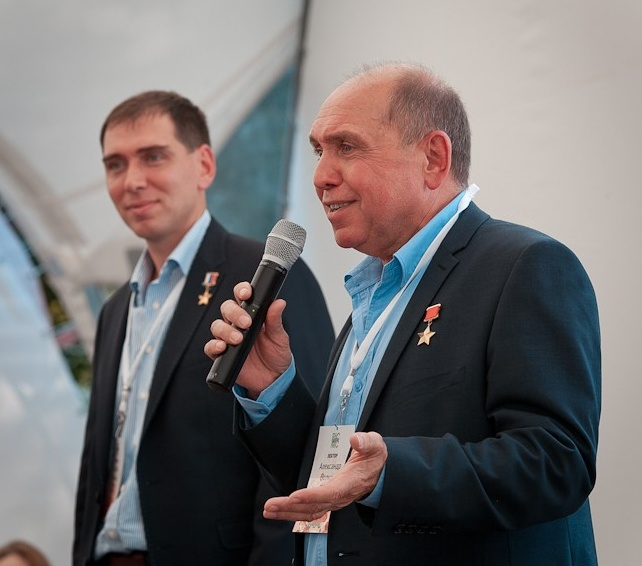
Russian cosmonauts Sergey Volkov and Aleksandr Volkov speaking at a festival event, 2013

=== 2011 ===
The first Geek Picnic took place, at the New Holland Island in Saint Petersburg, on August 6, 2011. It presented several scientific shows, including 3D printing and robotics, as well as indoor and outdoor activities like modern game consoles, monocycles, jumping stilts, gaming zone and sports ground. The festival attracted more than 1500 visitors.

=== 2012 ===
The second Geek Picnic was held at the same location on August, 3rd. It featured a wide variety of events including robot exhibition, a number of lectures in the format of TEDx and masterclasses by recognized experts from global (Gaidar Magdanurov from Microsoft, Yury Lifshits from Yahoo!), and Russian IT companies (Grachik Adzhamian, Alexey Voinov, Filipp Katz, Kirill Shichanov), a job fair for programmers and a dedicated Windarium Windows education site. The recreational zone offered open library, gaming space, sports and a picnic. Around 7000 people have visited the event.

=== 2013 ===
In 2013, Geek Picnic was a two-day festival held at Yelagin Island. The territory was divided into 4 zones dedicated to technology, science, art and picnic. The festival featured a display of most recent inventions in robotics and 3d printing, interactive science museum, meteorite exhibition and Fab lab. Event schedule included lectures by cosmonaut Alexander Volkov, historian Lev Lurie, a known polyglot, language teacher and television presenter Dmitry Petrov, engineer Anatoly Wasserman, and Nigel Ackland, known to be the world's first person to receive a bionic prosthetic arm, and numerous entrepreneurs, scientists and academics. The Russian quadcopter racing championship took place during the festival. Recreational areas included food court, playground and open-air exhibitions. Visitor count exceeded 15000 through 2 days.

=== 2014 ===
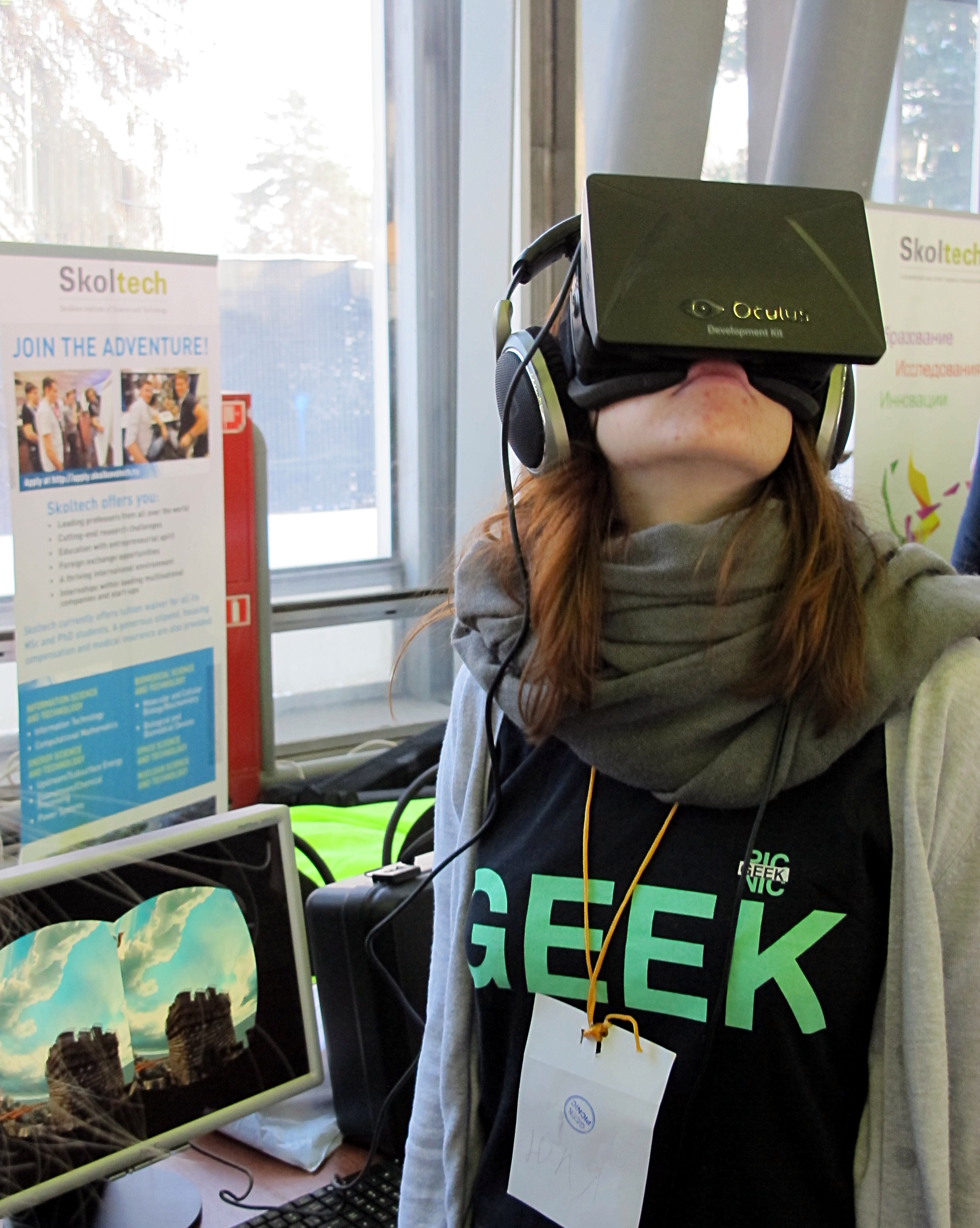
A girl testing Oculus Rift headset at Geek Picnic in Moscow, 2014

The winter session of 2014 Geek Picnic took place in VDNKh, Moscow, on January 25–26. Theme zones dedicated to technology, science and art, entertainment, lectorium and a playground for children were set up in a 15 thousand square meters pavilion. A number of speakers including Anatoly Wasserman and futurologist Dmitry Gluchovskiy gave lectures, and the founder of the Venus project Jacque Fresco held a skype conference call. The festival featured musical performance by Alexander Robotnick and the Desert Planet band. The displays included the world's biggest Tesla coil, 3D bioprinter prototype, quadcopter show, sculptures of Transformers characters and a robot show featuring Exoatlet hauler and InMoove android. The event had 30000 visitors.

The summer Geek Picnic was held at Yelagin Island, Saint-Petersburg, in August. The event schedule included over 60 lectures and 30 masterclasses and workshops, drone and robot operation competitions, programming contest. Festival featured DIY-zones, robotics and 3D printing exhibition as well as 3D printed fashion show by Larisa Katz, Pia Hinze and Joshua Harker and had a total of 18000 visitors.

=== 2015 ===
That year, both Moscow and Saint Petersburg festivals took place in summer. The Geek Picnic in Moscow was held in Krasnaya Presnya park and featured 6 theme zones named 'Technology', 'Science', 'Art', 'Picnic', 'Expo' and 'Market'. A huge convention of people with bionic implants and prosthetics was the core event of the festival. Bebionic pioneer [Nigel Ackland], Actress [Angel Giuffria],'cyborg' activist Neil Harbisson, Jens Naumann whose vision is partially restored by brain implant, drummer Jason Barnes with robotic arm, Christian Ristow with large-scale robotic arm 'The Hand of Man,' and model and singer Viktoria Modesta, were among the participants. The musicians who played on the 3D-printed instruments also performed on the Picnic. 2015 Moscow Geek Picnic schedule also included music show performed on 3D printed instruments, fireworks, drone championship, lectures by Anatoly Wasserman, space test pilot Sergey Ryazansky and painter Boryana Rossa, and a communication session with Gennady Padalka and Mikhail Kornienko from aboard the ISS. The festival in Moscow had 22000 visitors.

The Saint Petersburg 2015 Geek Picnic was held at Yelagin Island on June, 20th and 21st and had an event schedule similar to earlier Moscow festival. The visitors were greeted by Ristow's 6-ton robotic arm. The educational part of festival featured talks by the head of the Pushkin Museum Marina Loshak, artistic director of the Bolshoi Drama Theater Andrey Moguchy, musician Oleg Nesterov, ‘Mediaculture’ laboratory head Andrey Svibovich and other science and art workers joined by ‘cyborgs’ Nicolas Huchet and Viktoria Modesta. Pecha Kucha took place during the events. The festival had approximately 25000 visitors.

=== 2016 ===
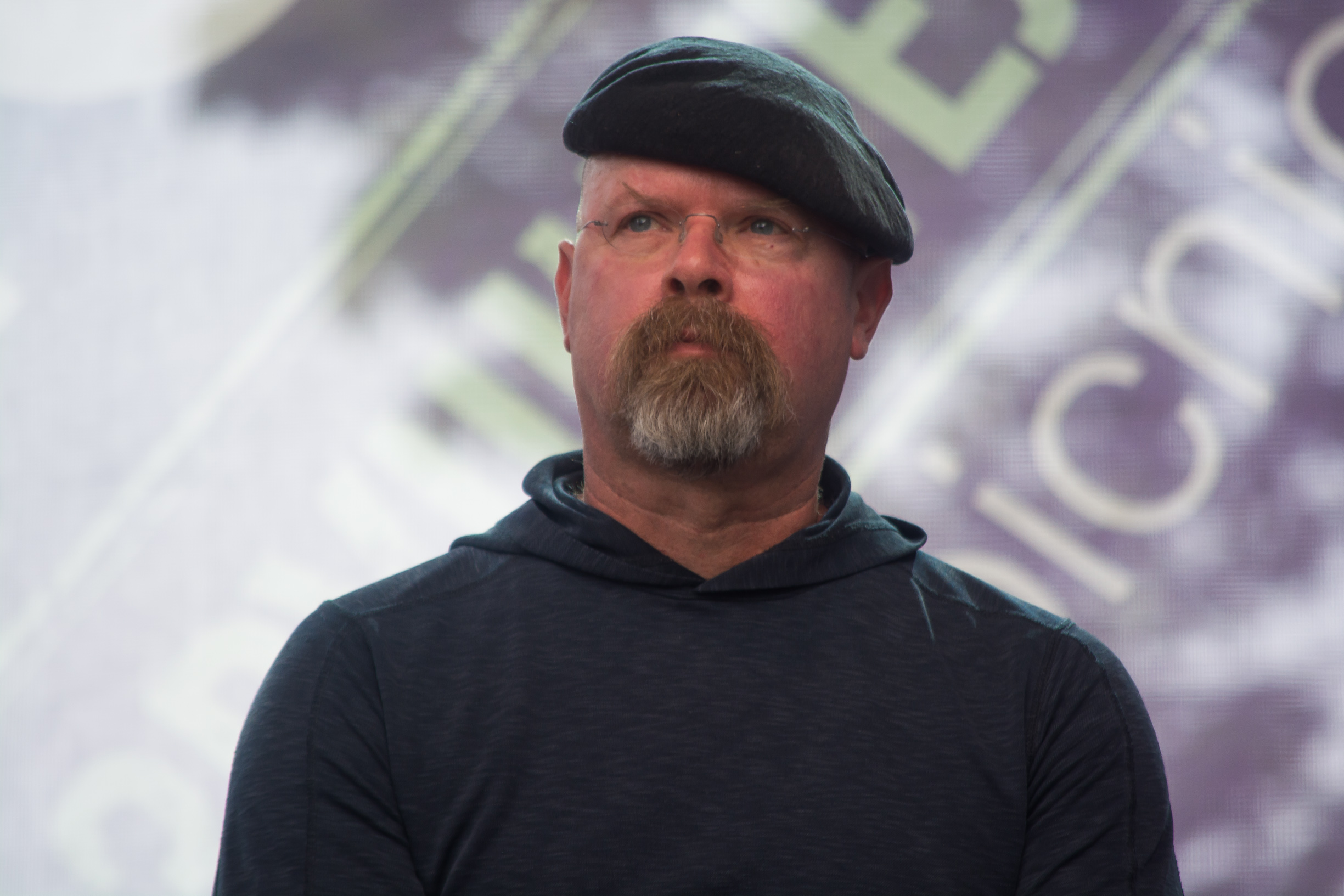
Jamie Hyneman at the Geek Picnic in St. Petersburg, 2016

The first Israeli Geek Picnic, attended by more than 35 thousand people, took place in the Sacher Park in the center of Jerusalem on April 25–27. There were about 150 exhibition stands, of which about 75% were represented by Israeli teams.

The Moscow festival was held on June 18–19 in the Kolomenskoye Museum, in St. Petersburg – on June 25–26 on Elagin Island. Jamie Hyneman, the MythBusters presenter, became the headliner of Russian festivals. More than 40 people gave lectures, including scientific journalist Asya Kazantseva, sculptor Andrey Bartenev, political analyst Anatoly Vasserman, space exploration popularizer Vitaly Egorov, space pilot and hero of the Russian Federation Anton Shkaplerov and others. Traditionally the festival was divided into zones "Science", "Technology", "Art" and "Picnic". ITMO University had its own section at the Petersburg festival, the Polytechnic University – at the Moscow festival. There was a Mars rover presented by St. Petersburg State University of Telecommunications and a five-meter high robot "Dragon", created in Stroganov Moscow State University of Arts and Industry.

In 2016 Geek Picnic beat the record for attendance: 29,000 people visited the St. Petersburg festival, the Moscow event attracted 27,000 spectators.

=== 2017 ===
In 2017, Moscow's Geek Picnic is scheduled for June 17–18 and will be held on the territory of the Kolomenskoye Museum. The festival in St. Petersburg will be held on June 24–25, in Pulkovo Park in the south of the city. The main theme of the festivals in 2017, co-organized by Kaspersky Lab, is "mind games". Among more than 20 invited researchers are Alexander Panchin, Petr Levich, Ilya Zakharov, Daniel Laman and Vasily Klyucharev. The key speaker of the St. Petersburg festival is the science popularizer Richard Dawkins, the astrophysicist Lawrence Krauss will be the main guest at the Moscow festival.
