= BabyX =

AI-powered virtual infant

- Developer: Mark Sagar
- Initial release: 2013
- Type: Artificial intelligence

BabyX is an interactive lifelike virtual infant created through the use of artificial intelligence by Mark Sagar, Creator and Director of the Laboratory for Animate Technologies located at the University of Auckland's Bioengineering Institute.

Created in 2013, BabyX is a virtual animated baby that learns and reacts like a human baby and was designed after the likeness of Sagar's own daughter when she was 18 months old. BabyX has a virtual brain built with detailed likeness to the human brain and work through an operating system called Brain Language, invented by Sagar and his team of researchers. Stimulated neurochemical reactions help BabyX decide how she will react.

BabyX is a project of Auckland's Bioengineering Institute Laboratory for Animate Technologies, to make a virtual animated baby that learns and reacts like a human baby. It uses the computer's cameras for "seeing" and microphones to "listen" as the inputs. The computer uses artificial intelligence algorithms for BabyX's "learning" and interpretation of the inputs (voice and image) to understand the situation. The result is a virtual toddler that can learn to read, recognize objects and "understand." The output is the baby's face that can "speak" and express its mood by facial expressions (such as smiling).

Previously, Sagar worked in computer-generated imagery (CGI) working on movies such as Avatar, King Kong, and others. In 2016, Sagar built upon BabyX's technology to launch Soul Machines, human-like avatars that use artificial intelligence to respond to human emotion.

== See also ==
- The Age of A.I.
