= 1 the Road =

Novel written by an artificial intelligence

- Front cover, 1 the Road
- Language: English
- Publisher: Jean Boîte Éditions
- Publication date: 2018

1 the Road is an experimental novel composed by artificial intelligence (AI). Emulating Jack Kerouac's On the Road, Ross Goodwin drove from New York to New Orleans in March 2017 with an AI in a laptop hooked up to various sensors, whose output the AI turned into words that were printed on rolls of receipt paper. The novel was published in 2018 by Jean Boîte Éditions.

Goodwin left the text unedited. Although he felt the prose was "choppy", and contained typographical errors, he wanted to present the machine-generated text verbatim, for future study. The story begins: "It was nine seventeen in the morning, and the house was heavy".

== Concept and execution ==
Emulating Jack Kerouac's novel On the Road, Ross Goodwin traveled from New York to New Orleans in March 2017 with three sensors, providing real-world input; a surveillance camera mounted on the trunk, trained on the passing scenery; a microphone, picking up conversations inside the car, and additionally the Global Positioning System (GPS), tracking the car's location.

Input from these sources, and the time provided by the computer's internal clock, was fed into a long short-term memory recurrent neural network, which in turn generated sentences on rolls of receipt paper.

The car was a Cadillac; Goodwin explained later he wanted an "authoritative" car (and was unable to get a Ford Crown Victoria), and worried that people might think him a terrorist if they saw the car with its electronics and wires. Google paid part of the cost, having become interested in Goodwin's work at New York University.

Accompanying him were five other people (including his sister and his fiancée), and the Cadillac was followed by a film crew which documented the four-day journey; the documentary was directed by Lewis Rapkin.

=== Training dataset ===
The training dataset included a sample fiction, consisting of three different text corpora, each with about 20 million words—one with poetry, one with science fiction, and one with "bleak" writing, in Goodwin's words. It had also been fed a data set from Foursquare; the AI recognized locations from Foursquare, and appended commentaries to them.

The conversations captured inside the car were rendered in mutated fashion. The locations provided by the GPS were outputted verbatim, to open the day's writing.

The novel was generated letter by letter. Due to continual input from the GPS and time clock, the novel often mentions the latitude, longitude, and time of day. It was printed unedited and thus is "choppy", according to Goodwin; typos were retained, since he wanted to show the text "in its most raw form".

Goodwin said his main purpose for this novel is to reveal the way machines create words: "In the future when this text becomes more sophisticated it's a warning. If you see patterns like this, it may not have been written by a human".

== Reviews ==
Thomas Hornigold, writing for Singularity Hub, concluded that the AI is no Jack Kerouac, but that "you might see, in the odd line, the flickering ghost of something like consciousness, a deeper understanding". Brian Merchant of The Atlantic read the entire novel in one sitting. He could not recognize a coherent plot or story arc, but saw "plenty of pixelated poetry in its ragtag assemblage of modern American imagery. And there are some striking and memorable lines".

== Ross Goodwin biography ==
Ross Goodwin, a former ghostwriter for the Obama administration and a creative technologist, has often used neural networks to create poetry and screenplays. Notable works include the short film Sunspring, starring Thomas Middleditch and directed by Goodwin's frequent collaborator Oscar Sharp, and Word.Camera, an 1885 bellows camera that outputs poetry about whatever it is pointed at when the button is pressed. His Master's Thesis at New York University was a project called "Narrated Reality", for which he walked around the city with a backpack containing compass, punch clock, and camera; data from these devices was fed into an LSTM neural network whose output was "weird associative poetry". A year after 1 the Road, Google hired him to work with their Artists and Machine Intelligence project.

== Quotes ==
- "All the time the sun / Is wheeling out of a dark bright ground".
- "The time was one minute past midnight. But he was the only one who had to sit on his way back. The time was one minute after midnight and the wind was still standing on the counter and the little patch of straw was still still and the street was open".
