= Oscar Sharp =

British film director

Oscar Sharp is a BAFTA-nominated British filmmaker best known for short films The Kármán Line, Sign Language and Sunspring, and upcoming television series The Human Conditions for HBO MAX, produced by Damon Lindelof and Matt Reeves.

== Work ==
In 2010, Sign Language, about an idealistic human billboard in London's Oxford Street, won the Reed Short Film Competition and Virgin Media Shorts.

His 2015 film The Kármán Line, starred Olivia Colman as a wife and mother who contracts an illness causing her to gradually levitate. It won Best Short at the British Independent Film Awards and was nominated for the Best British Short Film at the 68th BAFTAs 2015 and was produced by Campbell Beaton. The film was subsequently released by The New Yorker and PBS.

Sharp then signed with Tobey Maguire's company Material Pictures to develop his first feature film and was named a Star of Tomorrow by Screen International.

In 2016, Sharp teamed with creative technologist Ross Goodwin and actor Thomas Middleditch (Silicon Valley) to create Sunspring. It was the first film to be entirely scripted by artificial intelligence, and produced widespread international discussion.

Sharp and Goodwin followed Sunspring in 2017 with It's No Game, a short film depicting a Writers Guild of America strike in the face of artificial intelligence. It stars David Hasselhoff, in which the actor performs dialogue generated by an AI from a large collection of his past performances. It also stars Sarah Hay and Tom Payne (actor).

In 2016, 20th Century Fox signed Sharp to co-write and direct the feature film Woolly: The True Story of the De-Extinction of One of History’s Most Iconic Creatures, based on the upcoming book by Ben Mezrich (author of The Accidental Billionaires, basis of The Social Network). The book is an account of the de-extinction work of Harvard geneticist George M. Church, among others.

In 2021, HBO Max announced that it was developing The Human Conditions, a "Fantastical Medical Drama" about "a young British doctor that must treat impossible illnesses and the emotional issues that underlie them" created by Sharp and executive produced by Damon Lindelof & Matt Reeves.

== Background and education ==
Sharp grew up in a rural British village, and with no connections to the film industry. He attended NYU Graduate Film on a Fulbright scholarship. His professors were Todd Solondz, Spike Lee and Darren Aronofsky.
