= Desert Planet =

Finnish band

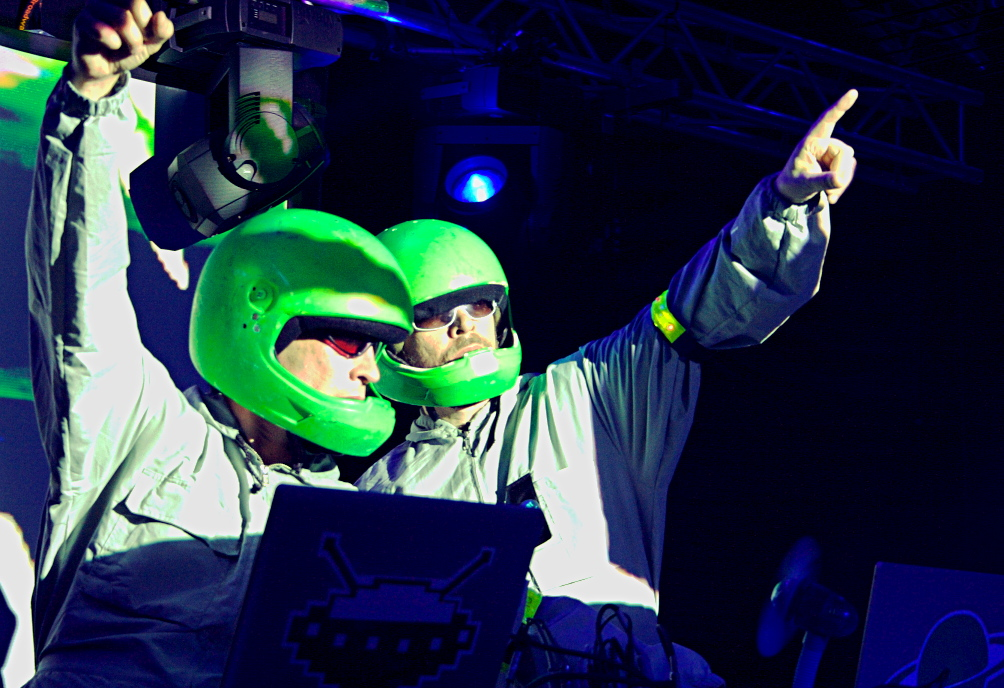
- Desert Planet playing at Assembly '08

Background information
- Origin: Rovaniemi, Lapland, Finland
- Genre: Bitpop
- Years active: 1999 - present
- Labels: Stupido Records; 9pm Records
- Members: Jukka Tarkiainen; Jari Mikkola; Antti Hovila
- Website: Official Site

Desert Planet is a band from Lapland, northern Finland consisting of Jukka Tarkiainen, Jari Mikkola and Antti Hovila. They perform electronic music influenced by 8-bit video games, coin-operated games and science fiction movies, generally characterised as bitpop or micromusic. They have released five albums and continue to perform live.

== Career ==
Both Mikkola and Tarkianen were members of rock bands, before embarking on Desert Planet. It began as solo project by Jukka Tarkiainen (ex Jalla Jalla) who 'wanted to do something that rocks with computers'. Jari Mikkola (ex Greenhouse AC) joined the group in 2001 after directing a music video for the title song of the first album Asteroid Hopper. In 2003 Desert Planet released an album Joystick Pop through a label called ODOR, a sub-label of the Universal Music Group. A third album, Turbo Tellytunes was released in 2004. By the end of that year, the band signed a recording deal with a German label 9pm-records, to distribute their releases in Germany, Austria and Switzerland, Stupido Records (Finland) did the same in Scandinavia. It was followed by the album Mario Built My Hot Rod, which featured Aleksi Eeben and Eläkeläiset. In December 2005 the band was given the "Artist of the year" award by the Arts Council of Lapland because of their innovative music, creative web appearance and do-it-yourself music exporting.

In May 2007 Desert Planet released a USB memory stick called "Aska-Osaka Virtual Highway" packed with multimedia and music. In 2008, they released the album Moonrocks, followed two years later by a collection Extra Ball.

Desert Planet create electronic dance music or electropop with influences from 1980s game consoles and computers like Nintendo Entertainment System, Amiga and Commodore 64. Their music videos and live performances present the band through b-class science fiction aesthetics, aided by pixellated video projections created by VJ Antti Hovila. Besides being a member of Desert Planet, Jari Mikkola teaches multimedia at the Art Department of the University of Lapland.

== Discography ==
=== Albums ===
- Asteroid Hopper (Dese 001, 2001)
- Joystick Pop (Odor, 2003)
- Turbo Tellytunes (Dese 002, 2004)
- Mario Built My Hot Rod (9pm Records/Stupido Records, 2005)
- Moonrocks (9pm Records/Stupido Records, 2008)
- Extra Ball - The Best Of (9pm Records, 2010)

=== Other ===
- Dune Buggy (Odor, 2002, Single)
- Aska-Osaka Virtual Highway ( Dese 003, 2007, USB flash drive memory stick)
