= Hugh Herr =

American rock climber and bioengineer

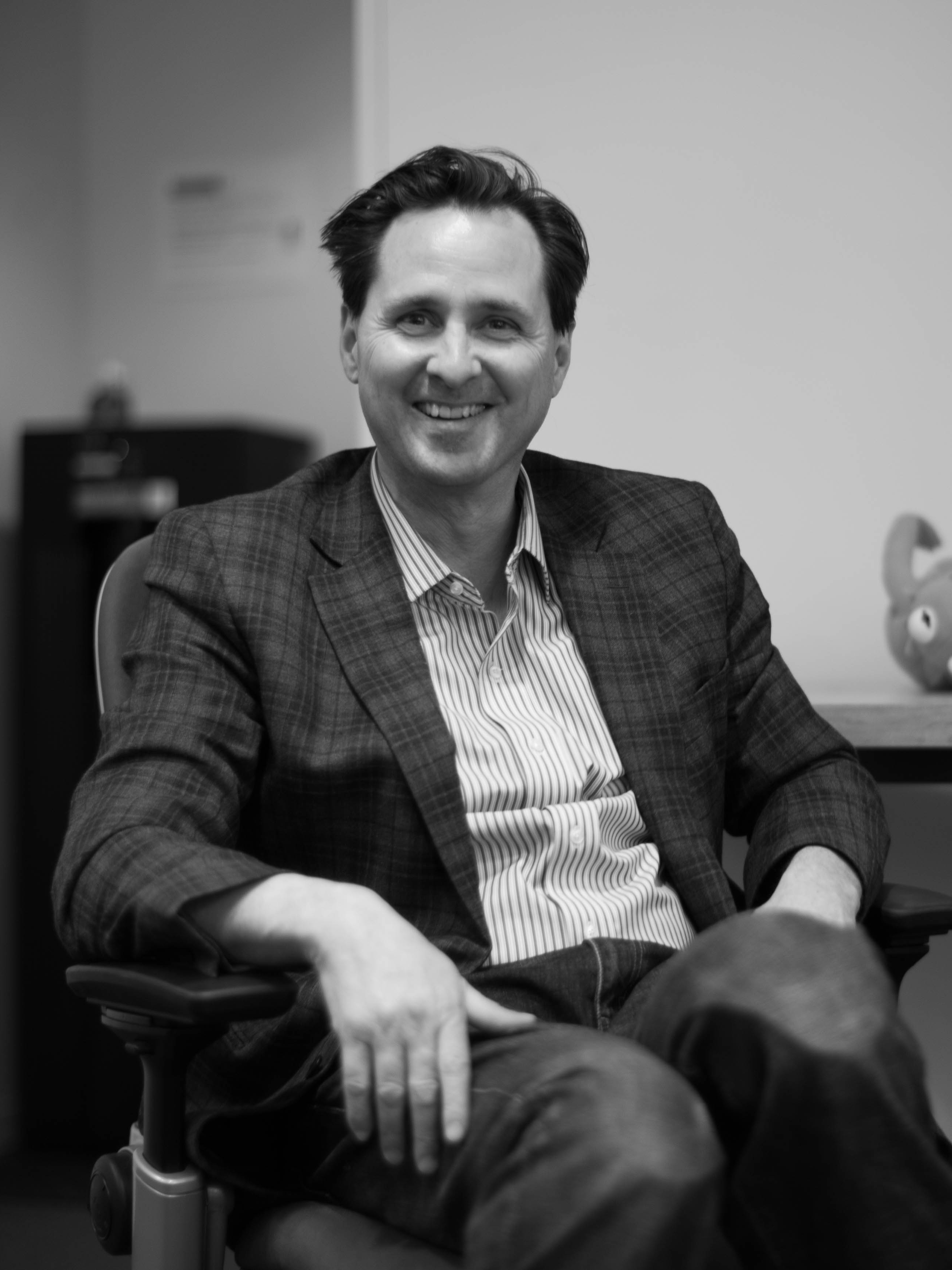
- Herr in 2013
- Born: Hugh Miller Herr; October 25, 1964 (age 62); Lancaster, Pennsylvania, U.S.
- Education: Millersville University; Massachusetts Institute of Technology; Harvard University
- Scientific career
- Fields: Biophysics; Mechanical engineering Physics
- Workplaces: Massachusetts Institute of Technology
- Website: media.mit.edu

Hugh Herr (born October 25, 1964) is an American rock climber, engineer, and biophysicist. When he was young, both of his legs were amputated below the knee due to an accident during an unexpected blizzard that occurred on a rock climbing trip. After months of surgeries and rehabilitation, Herr began climbing again, using specialized prostheses he designed for himself, becoming the first person with a major amputation to perform in a sport on par with elite-level, able-bodied persons. He holds the patents to the Rheo Knee, an active ankle-foot orthosis, which is the world's first powered ankle-foot prosthesis.

== Early life ==
The youngest of five siblings of a Mennonite family from Lancaster, Pennsylvania, Hugh Herr was a prodigy rock climber: by age 8, he had scaled the face of the 11,627-foot (3,544 m) Mount Temple in the Canadian Rockies, and by 17 he was acknowledged to be one of the best climbers in the United States.

In January 1982, after having ascended a difficult technical ice route in Huntington Ravine on Mount Washington in New Hampshire, Herr and fellow climber Jeff Batzer were caught in a blizzard and became disoriented, finally descending into the Great Gulf where they passed three nights in −20 °F (−29 °C) degree temperatures. By the time they were rescued, the climbers had severe frostbite. Both of Herr's legs had to be amputated below the knees; Batzer lost his lower left leg, the toes on his right foot, and the thumb and fingers on his right hand. During the rescue attempt, volunteer Albert Dow was killed by an avalanche.

Following months of surgeries and rehabilitation, Herr was doing what doctors told him was unthinkable: climbing again. Using specialized prostheses that he designed, he created prosthetic feet with high toe stiffness that made it possible to stand on small rock edges the width of a coin, and titanium-spiked feet that assisted him in ascending steep ice walls. He used these prostheses to alter his height to avoid awkward body positions and to grab hand and foot holds previously out of reach. His height could range from five to eight feet (1.5 to 2.4 m). As a result of using the prostheses, Herr climbed at a more advanced level than he had before the accident, making him the first person with a major amputation to perform in a sport on par with elite-level, able-bodied persons.

== Career ==
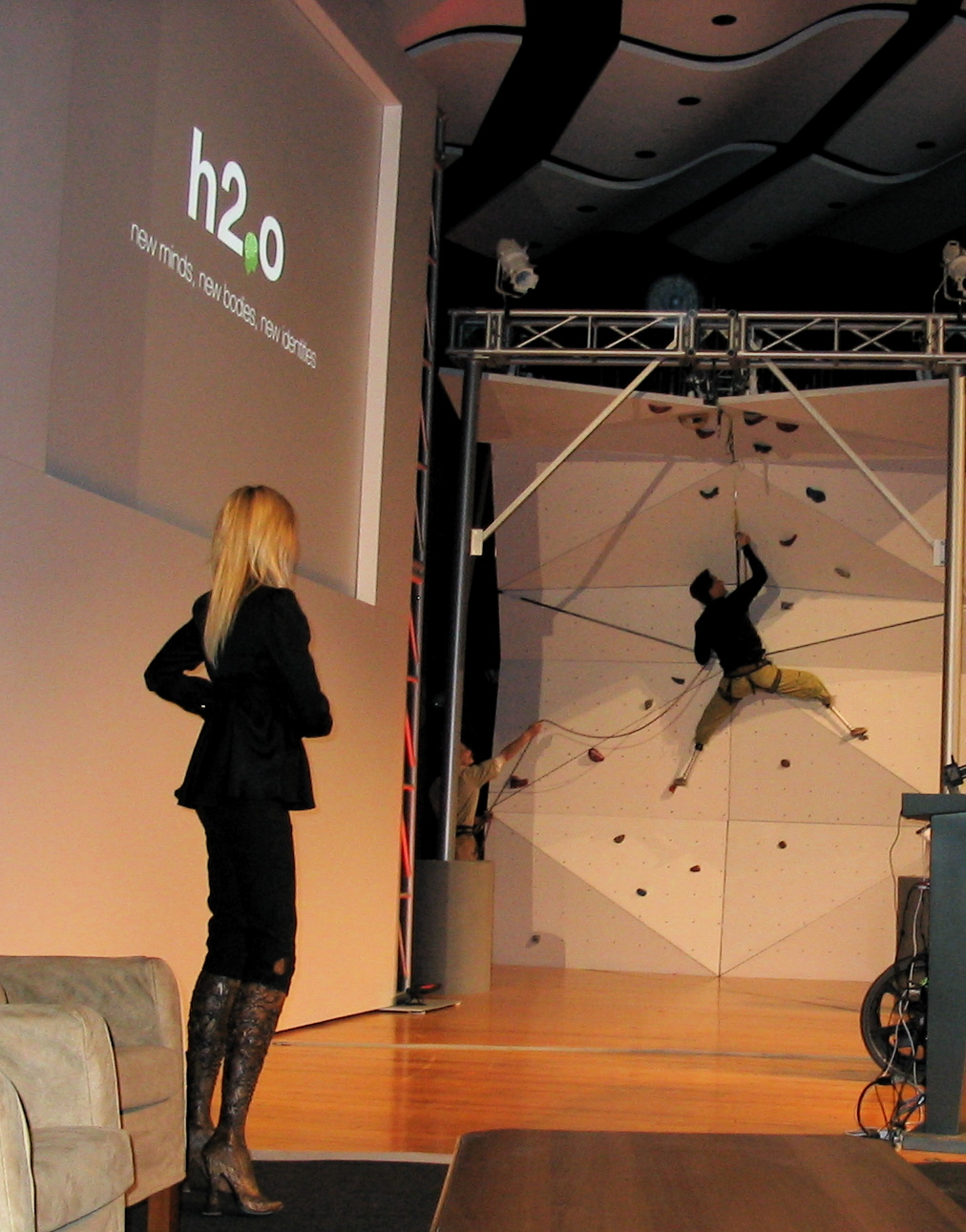
Hugh Herr climbs the wall at the MIT Media Lab's h2.0 symposium on May 9, 2007, watched by fellow bilateral amputee Aimee Mullins

While a postdoctoral fellow at MIT in biomedical devices, Herr began working on advanced leg prostheses and orthoses, devices that emulate the functionality of the human leg. He is now a professor at the MIT Media Lab, where he directs the Biomechatronics research group and co-directs the K. Lisa Yang Center for Bionics. At the center, he focuses on developing wearable robotic systems that serve to augment human physical capability. Most of what he designs is not for him, but for others to whose difficulties he can relate. The devices he designs are advancing an emerging field of engineering science that applies principles of biomechanics and neural control to guide the designs of human rehabilitation and augmentative devices. The goal is to rehabilitate individuals that have undergone limb amputation or have a pathology, and also to augment human physical capability for those with normal intact physiologies.

Herr holds the patents to a computer-controlled artificial knee, commercially available as the Rheo Knee an active ankle-foot orthosis, and the world's first powered ankle-foot prosthesis. The computer-controlled knee, which is outfitted with a microprocessor that continually senses the joint's position and the loads applied to the limb, was named one of the Top Ten Inventions in the health category by Time magazine in 2004. The robotic ankle-foot prosthesis, which mimics the action of a biological leg and, for the first time, provides transtibial amputees with a natural gait, was named to the same Time top-ten list in 2007.

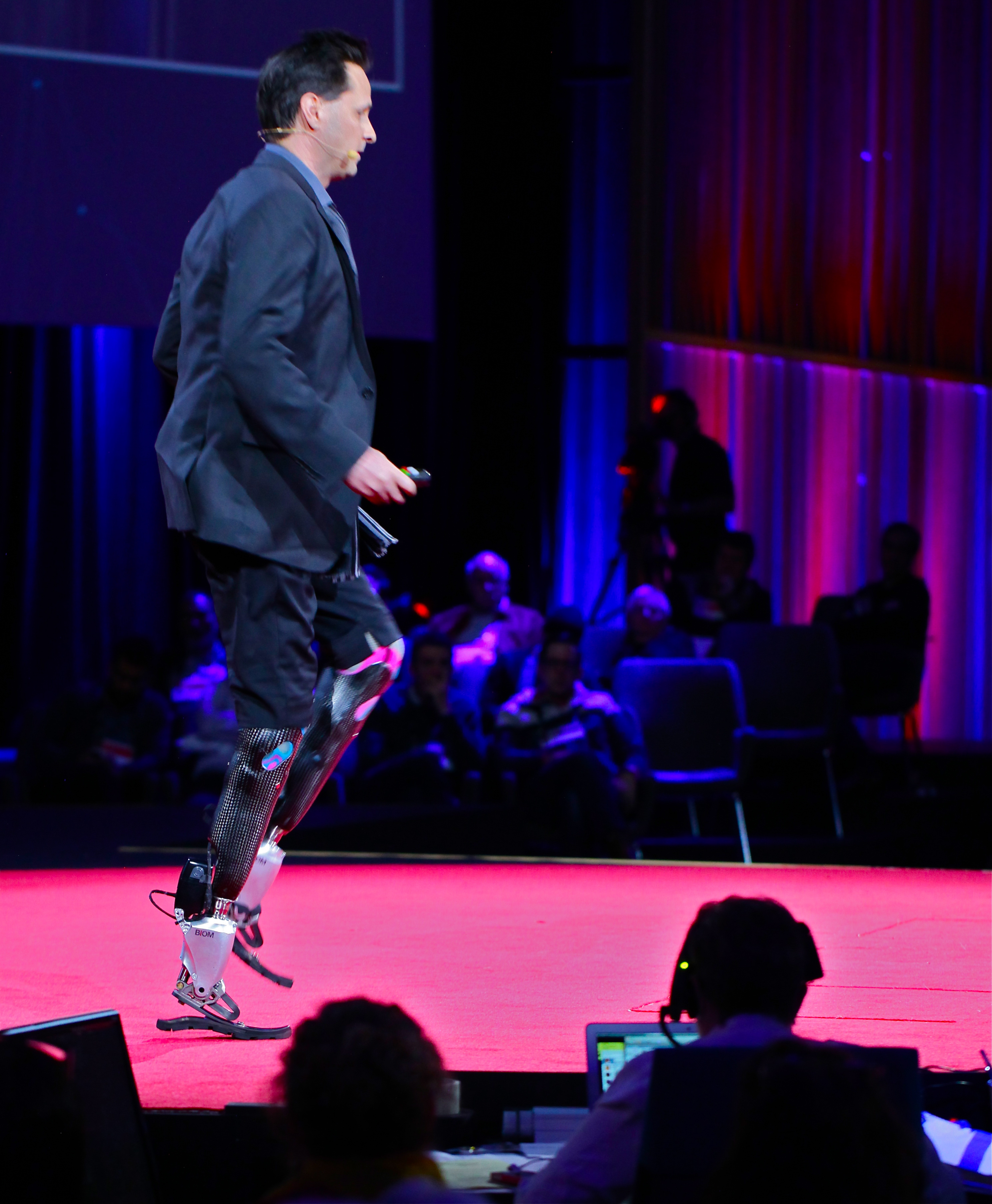
Herr presenting prosthetic legs at TED 2014, where he first demonstrated a running gait under neural command.

== Oscar Pistorius ==
Herr was a member of a team of seven experts in biomechanics and physiology from six universities that conducted research on the mechanics of Oscar Pistorius' running blades. The South African bilateral amputee track athlete was banned by the International Association of Athletics Federations (IAAF) from running in able-bodied events, as previous research had shown the blades gave him a competitive advantage. A portion of these results were presented to the Court of Arbitration for Sport (CAS) in Lausanne, Switzerland in May 2008, by Herr and colleague Rodger Kram which resulted in reversing the ban. This allowed Pistorius to become the first disabled sprint runner to qualify against able-bodied athletes for an Olympic event. The full findings of the team's experiments were published in the June 18, 2009 issue of the Journal of Applied Physiology.

== Grants and awards ==
- Sports Hall of Fame (1989)
- United States College Academic Team (1990)
- Young American Award (1990)
- Science magazine Next Wave: Best of 2003
- Time magazine Top Ten Inventions 2004
- With the Providence VA Center for Restorative and Regenerative Medicine and Brown University, a $7.2 million grant from the US Department of Veterans Affairs to create "biohybrid" limbs to restore natural function to amputees. (2004)
- Popular Mechanics Breakthrough Leadership Award (2005)
- The 13th Annual Heinz Award in Technology, the Economy and Employment (2007)
- Time magazine Top Ten Inventions 2007
- Action Maverick Award (2008)
- Spirit of Da Vinci Award (2008)
- R&D Magazine's 2014 Innovator of the Year
- Smithsonian magazine's American Ingenuity Award (2014) in the Technology Category
- Princess of Asturias Awards for Technical & Scientific Research (2016)

== Rock climbs ==
- 1983 Vandals, Gunks, FA with Lynn Hill and Russ Clune, first 5.13 on the East Coast.
- 1984 Stage Fright (5.12c X), Cathedral Ledge, North Conway, NH. First Ascent.
- 1986 Ride of the Valkyries (5.12a), Careno Crag, Leavenworth, WA – First Ascent.
- 1986 City Park (5.13c), Index Town Walls, WA – 2nd ascent.
