= Brian Merchant =

Writer and technology journalist

- Merchant in 2025
- Born: Sacramento, California, U.S.
- Education: UC Santa Barbara
- Occupations: Technology journalist, author
- Writing career
- Notable works: The One Device: The Secret History of the iPhone (2017), Blood in the Machine: The Origins of the Rebellion Against Big Tech (2023)
- Website: brianmerchant.org

Brian Merchant is an American technology journalist and author. His work often focuses on social and environmental issues relating to technology and tech companies. His writing has appeared in publications including The New York Times, Wired, Slate, The Atlantic, and The Guardian. He was the technology columnist at the Los Angeles Times in from 2023 to early 2024. He has written two books, The One Device: the Secret History of the iPhone (2017) and Blood in the Machine: the Origins of the Rebellion against Big Tech (2023).

He currently works full time reporting for his Substack newsletter, Blood in the Machine, where he reports on how big tech and developments in generative AI affect workers and consumers.

== Career ==
Merchant is from Sacramento, California, and he is a graduate of UC Santa Barbara. While at Vice, he co-founded Terraform, a speculative fiction section of Motherboard. In January 2023, he became the technology columnist at the Los Angeles Times. In January 2024, Merchant was laid off in a wave of layoffs exceeding 20% of newsroom staff at the Los Angeles Times. In February 2025, Merchant began working full time reporting for his Substack newsletter Blood in the Machine.

== Books ==
- The One Device: the Secret History of the iPhone (Little, Brown, 2017)
- Blood in the Machine: the Origins of the Rebellion against Big Tech (Little, Brown, 2023)
