= Jason Barnes (drummer) =

American drummer (born 1989)

Jason Barnes (born 1989 in Guam) is an American amputee drummer with a robotic arm.

Having started out a career with a music band, in 2012 Barnes lost one of his arms in an accident. After the amputation, Barnes created his own prosthetic arm in an attempt to be able to play the drums; he was accepted into the drumming program at the Atlanta Institute of Music.

Later on he started working with Gil Weinberg at the Georgia Institute of Technology Institute for Robotics and Intelligent Machines to develop a cyborg arm that enables him to play his drum kit.

In 2015 he took part in the Geek Picnic festival in Moscow. He also took part at Robotronica in Brisbane, Australia.

Currently, the experience gathered around Barnes is helping create future technology for people with disabilities.
