= Tim Shaw (American football) =

American football player (born 1984)

No. 57, 58, 59, 97
- Position: Linebacker

Personal information
- Born: March 27, 1984 (age 42); Exeter, England
- Listed height: 6 ft 1 in (1.85 m)
- Listed weight: 236 lb (107 kg)

Career information
- High school: Clarenceville (Livonia, Michigan, U.S.)
- College: Penn State (2002–2006)
- NFL draft: 2007: 5th round, 164th overall pick

Career history
- Carolina Panthers (2007); Jacksonville Jaguars (2008); Chicago Bears (2009); Tennessee Titans (2010–2012)

Career NFL statistics
- Total tackles: 128
- Forced fumbles: 3
- Fumble recoveries: 2
- Stats at Pro Football Reference

Timothy Bruce Shaw (born March 27, 1984) is a former American football linebacker who played in the National Football League (NFL). He played college football at Penn State and was selected by the Carolina Panthers in the fifth round of the 2007 NFL draft.

Shaw also played for the Jacksonville Jaguars, Chicago Bears, and Tennessee Titans.

== College career ==
Shaw was recruited out of Livonia Clarenceville High School as a running back. A three-star recruit, he decided to attend Penn State, spurning other scholarship offers from Big Ten schools such as Michigan and Michigan State. Shaw saw extensive playing time on special teams and began earning snaps on defense. He became a starter, playing alongside Bednarik Award winning linebackers Paul Posluszny and Dan Connor, on what many people consider the best Penn State linebacking corps of all time. Shaw was a 2006 Academic All-American.

== Professional career ==
Pre-draft measurables
Height	Weight	Arm length	Hand span	40-yard dash	10-yard split	20-yard split	20-yard shuttle	Three-cone drill	Vertical jump	Broad jump	Bench press
6 ft 1 1/2 in (1.87 m)	236 lb (107 kg)	31 3/8 in (0.80 m)	9 1/4 in (0.23 m)	4.46 s	1.49 s	2.54 s	4.12 s	6.90 s	36.5 in (0.93 m)	10 ft 6 in (3.20 m)	26 reps
All values from NFL Combine/Pro Day

=== Carolina Panthers ===
In the 2007 NFL draft, Shaw was selected in the 5th round by the Carolina Panthers.

=== Jacksonville Jaguars ===
Shaw was signed by the Jacksonville Jaguars on November 26, 2008, and appeared in three games for the Jaguars that season. He spent the 2009 preseason in Jacksonville's camp before being released on September 5, 2009.

=== Chicago Bears ===
The Chicago Bears signed Shaw on September 14, 2009, after opening-week injuries to linebackers Brian Urlacher and Pisa Tinoisamoa depleted their linebacking corps. He set a club record for special teams tackles with 30 after an 8 tackle performance with a forced fumble and recovery against the Detroit Lions (January 3, 2010). On January 27, 2010, USA Today announced that Shaw had made its All-Joe Team, honoring the NFL's unsung and underrated players.

=== Tennessee Titans ===
On September 5, 2010, Shaw was claimed off waivers by the Tennessee Titans. He played in 48 games over three seasons for the Titans and was their special teams captain in 2011 and 2012. He was released during final cuts on August 31, 2013.

== NFL career statistics ==
Legend
**Bold**	Career high

Year	Team	Games		Tackles					Interceptions					Fumbles			
Year	Team	GP	GS	Cmb	Solo	Ast	Sck	TFL	Int	Yds	TD	Lng	PD	FF	FR	Yds	TD
2007	CAR	14	0	14	12	2	0.0	0	0	0	0	0	0	0	0	0	0
2008	JAX	3	0	3	3	0	0.0	0	0	0	0	0	0	0	0	0	0
2009	CHI	15	0	24	21	3	0.0	0	0	0	0	0	0	**1**	**1**	0	0
2010	TEN	**16**	1	29	21	8	0.0	**2**	0	0	0	0	0	**1**	**1**	0	0
2011	TEN	**16**	0	14	10	4	0.0	0	0	0	0	0	0	0	0	0	0
2012	TEN	**16**	**2**	**44**	**30**	**14**	0.0	**2**	0	0	0	0	0	**1**	0	0	0
		80	3	128	97	31	0.0	4	0	0	0	0	0	3	2	0	0

== Personal life ==
Shaw is a Christian. He has said that his faith is "... the foundation of who I am." Shaw has gone on two mission trips to Costa Rica and two mission trips to Haiti.

Shaw is close friends with former tight end Kevin Boss. The two are represented by the same firm, XAM Sports, and were roommates while training in Florida prior to the 2007 NFL draft. He attended Boss' July 4, 2009 wedding.

Shaw is reportedly a jigsaw puzzle enthusiast.

=== ALS ===
On August 19, 2014, Shaw revealed in a video that he has ALS. He then dumped a bucket of ice water over himself as part of the Ice Bucket Challenge. He has since been heavily involved in efforts to advance ALS research through better funding, and raise awareness about ALS, using different platforms. He is considered to be a champion of the cause, and has impacted ALS communities throughout the country.

On March 19, 2015, Shaw addressed the Tennessee General Assembly, making a pitch that would declare the month of May as ALS Awareness Month in Tennessee. On April 18, 2015, Best Man Tim held a fundraising event during Penn State's Blue White weekend that included an Ice Bucket Challenge. Shaw attended the dedicated event where he signed autographs, posed for photographs, and enjoyed the support of hundreds of community members. A large amount of Penn State legends and lettermen supported the event, including the Paterno Family. Jay Paterno participated in Best Man Tim's Blue White weekend event.

On August 27, 2017, Shaw's high school renamed its football stadium after him. At halftime of a football game, the Clarenceville High School introduced the David B. McDowell Field at Shaw Stadium in honor of Shaw. That same year, Shaw's book titled "Blitz Your Life: Stories From An NFL And ALS Warrior" was released. Shaw has continued to help fundraise for ALS research, inspire others who are battling ALS, and make himself available wherever he can be helpful to others. In 2017, Shaw was invited to speak to the current Penn State football team he spoke about his challenges after his diagnosis and spoke about his time playing football at Penn State and his experience in the NFL. His speech resonated with head coach James Franklin who posted his speech on his Twitter account which gained national attention. On November 18, 2017, Shaw was the honorary captain for Penn State's game vs the Nebraska Cornhuskers. He was honored with a video tribute and standing ovation by fans along with both teams.

In 2019, Shaw participated in a Player's Tribune article about his journey with ALS, in which he encouraged his younger self and others to "live your best life today and enjoy every little blessing."

On December 18, 2019, a documentary video was released on YouTube that covered Project Euphonia. Google teamed up with Dimitri Kenevsky to create an AI-powered live transcription application that was specifically trained to understand and transcribe Shaw's impaired voice. Using hours of interviews as audio reference, a separate AI program was created to synthesize Shaw's old voice. While still in beta, the hope is to some day give Shaw the ability to clearly communicate again.
