= Sunspring =

- Directed by: Oscar Sharp
- Written by: Benjamin
- Produced by: Andrew Kortschak, Walter Kortschak, Andrew Swett, Allison Friedman
- Production company: End Cue
- Release date: 9 June 2016
- Running time: 9 minutes
- Countries: United Kingdom; United States
- Language: English

Sunspring is a 2016 experimental science fiction short film entirely written by an artificial intelligence bot using neural networks. It was conceived by BAFTA-nominated filmmaker Oscar Sharp and NYU AI researcher Ross Goodwin and produced by film production company, End Cue along with Allison Friedman and Andrew Swett. It stars Thomas Middleditch, Elisabeth Grey, and Humphrey Ker as three people, namely H, H2, and C, living in a future world and eventually connecting with each other through a love triangle. The script of the film was authored by a recurrent neural network called long short-term memory (LSTM) by an AI bot named Benjamin.

Originally made for the Sci-Fi-London film festival's 48hr Challenge, it was released online by technology news website Ars Technica on 9 June 2016.

== Premise ==
Sunspring narrates the story of three people - H (Middleditch), H2 (Grey), and C (Ker) - set in a futuristic world and entangled with murder and love.

== Cast ==
- Thomas Middleditch as H
- Elisabeth Grey as H2
- Humphrey Ker as C

== Production ==
Oscar Sharp originally created the film for the 48hr Film Challenge contest of Sci-Fi-London, a film festival which focuses on science fiction. For the challenge, contestants are given a set of prompts (mostly props and lines) that have to appear in a movie they make over the next two days. It eventually contested in the festival and was nominated among the final top ten films

Sharp collaborated with his longtime associate Ross Goodwin, an AI researcher in New York University to create the AI bot, which was initially called Jetson. The bot, which later came to call itself Benjamin, wrote the screenplay including stage directions and dialog. The garbled script was then interpreted by Sharp who directed the actors to construe the plot points themselves and enact the play. According to Ars Technica, the final plot turned out to be a tale of romance and murder, set in a dark future world.

=== Benjamin, the automatic screenwriter ===
Called the world's first automatic screenwriter, Benjamin is a self-improving LSTM RNN machine intelligence trained on human screenplays conceived by Goodwin and Sharp. It was trained to write the screenplay by feeding it with a corpus of dozens of sci-fi screenplays found online—mostly movies from the 1980s and 90s.

== Music ==
The film contains a song from Brooklyn-based electro-acoustic duo Tiger and Man, with lyrics written by Benjamin using a database of 30,000 folk songs. As well as a score written by composer Andrew Orkin.

== Reception ==
CNET called it "a beautiful, bizarre sci-fi novelty." Critic Amanda Kooser said, "...probably won't start a rush for replacing human screenwriters with machines. Some day, neural networks may get better at imitating the art of coherent storytelling, but we're not there yet. That doesn't mean "Sunspring" isn't entertaining or worthy of viewing. It is. It's a thought experiment come to life, a novelty." As of April 2019, it has surpassed 1 million views on YouTube.

== See also ==
- Artificial intelligence
