= Švanda Theatre in Smíchov =

Theatre in Prague, Czech Republic

- Švandovo divadlo na Smíchově

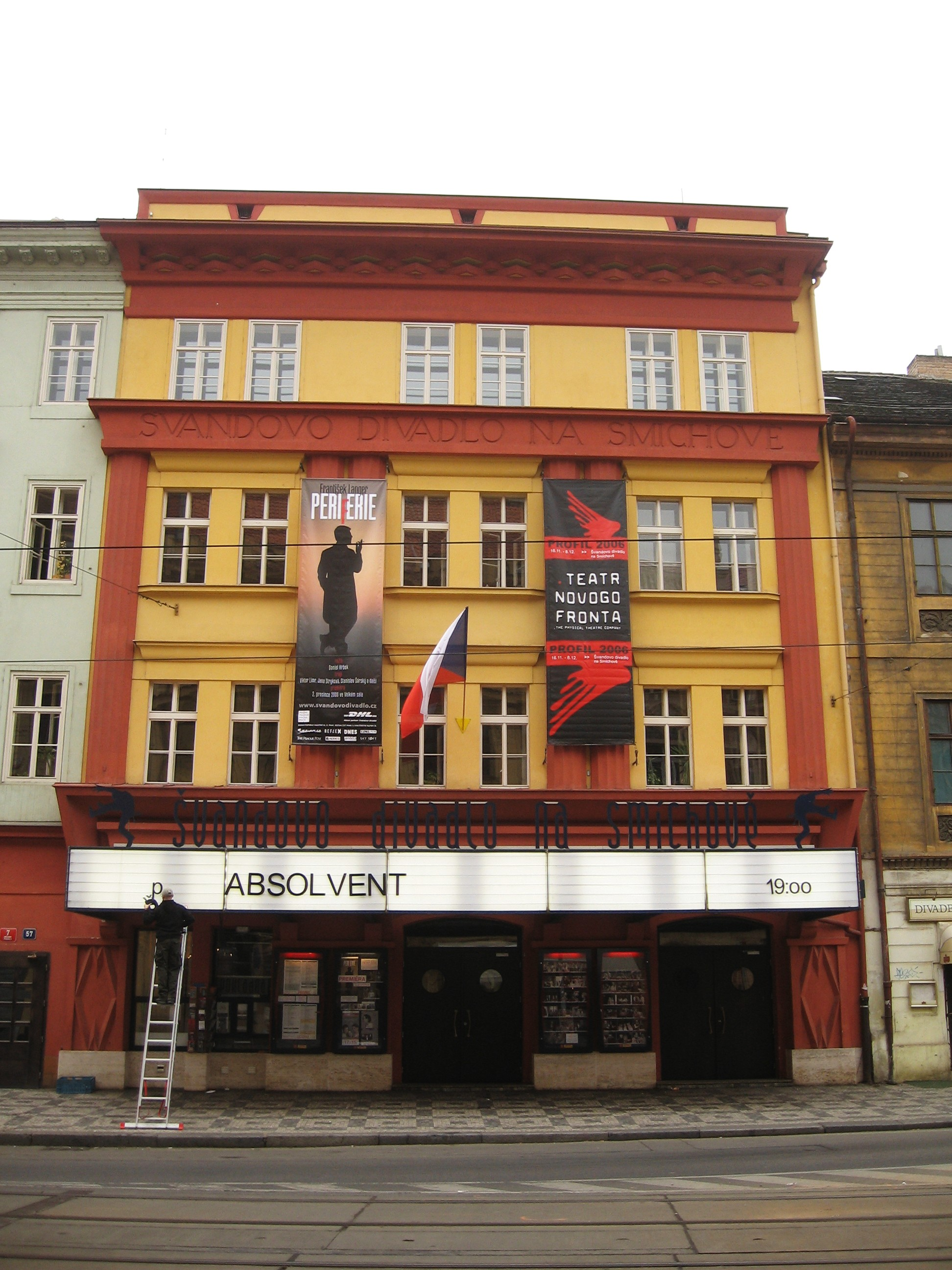
- Interactive map of Švanda Theatre in Smíchov
- Address: Štefánikova 6/57; Prague 5 Czech Republic
- Coordinates: 50°4′40.12″N 14°24′14.45″E
- Capacity: 300

Construction
- Opened: 2002

Website
- Official website

Švanda Theatre in Smíchov (Czech: Švandovo divadlo na Smíchově) is a theatre in Smíchov a suburb of Prague. It continues the long tradition of the previous theatre based in this building and its surroundings.

A theatre was established on the site in 1871 by Pavel Švanda called Arena Eggenberg but the arena was demolished in 1891, an built a new arena the current Smíchov, theatre.

In 1900 the theatre was radically rebuilt when the position of the stage and auditorium was changed, and the layout has been preserved. In 1908, then it was renamed the Intimate Theatre. In 1928, during the beginning of the economic crisis was dissolved file and in the building of the theatre was owned by several tenants. In the years 1928-1930 he became the theatre Vlasta Burian, in 1931–1932, then comic theatre (Ferenc Futurista and Jara Kohout). Since 1932 the theatre has once again as Švanda Theatre in 1935-1938 then letting Jara Kohout and from 1939 to 1944, then Jaroslav Fošen.

After the war, authorities banned its traditional theatrical business and there arose soviet version of the Realistic theatre, including a 1953 renaming the realistic theatre Zdeněk Nejedlý. In 1991 with the fall of communism it was renamed the Theatre Labyrinth. In 1998 the theatre was long closed but re-opened in 2002 as Švanda Theatre in Smíchov.
