= Ayuso =

Ayuso may refer to:

== People ==
- Elías Larry Ayuso (born 1977), Puerto Rican basketball player
- Esther Ayuso (born 1958), the first female Belizean architect
- Isabel Díaz Ayuso (born 1978), Spanish politician
- Joaquín Ayuso (born 1955), Spanish businessman
- Juan Ayuso (born 2002), Spanish cyclist
- Manuel Sánchez Ayuso (1941–1982), Spanish economist and politician
- María del Pilar Ayuso González (born 1942), Spanish politician and Member of the European Parliament
- Miguel Ángel Ayuso Guixot (born 1952), Spanish prelate of the Catholic Church and an historian of Islam
- Marisol Ayuso (born 1943), Spanish stage, movie and television actress
- Omar Ayuso (born 1998), Spanish actor

== Places ==
- Heras de Ayuso, municipality located in the province of Guadalajara, Castile-La Mancha, Spain
- Navares de Ayuso, municipality located in the province of Segovia, Castile and León, Spain
