= Campus Party =

Technology conference and hackathon

- Campus Party
- Locations: Italy; Brazil; Colombia; USA; Argentina; Uruguay; Paraguay; Singapore; El Salvador; Germany; The Netherlands; United Kingdom; Costa Rica; Ecuador; Mexico; Spain
- Years active: 22
- Inaugurated: 1997 (Madrid, Spain)
- Website: www.campus-party.org

Campus Party (CP) is a conference and hackathon.

Founded in 1997 as a technology festival and LAN party, the event was first held in Málaga, Spain, and has since been run in Argentina, Brazil, Canada, Colombia, Costa Rica, Ecuador, El Salvador, Germany, Italy, Mexico, Paraguay, Singapore, Spain, the Netherlands, Uruguay and USA.

The event has evolved into an annual week-long, 24-hour-a-day festival involving online communities, gamers, programmers, bloggers, governments, universities, companies and students and covers technology innovation and electronic entertainment, with an emphasis on free software, programming, astronomy, social media, gaming, green technology, robotics, security networks and computer modeling.

== History ==
In December 1996 EnRED, a Spanish youth organization, wanted to found a small, private LAN party held at the Benalmádena Youth Center in Andalucía, Spain. Paco Regageles, then director of Channel 100, suggested they expand the event, and promoted it as a LAN party under the original name, the "Ben-Al Party" in reference to the event's location in Benalmádena.

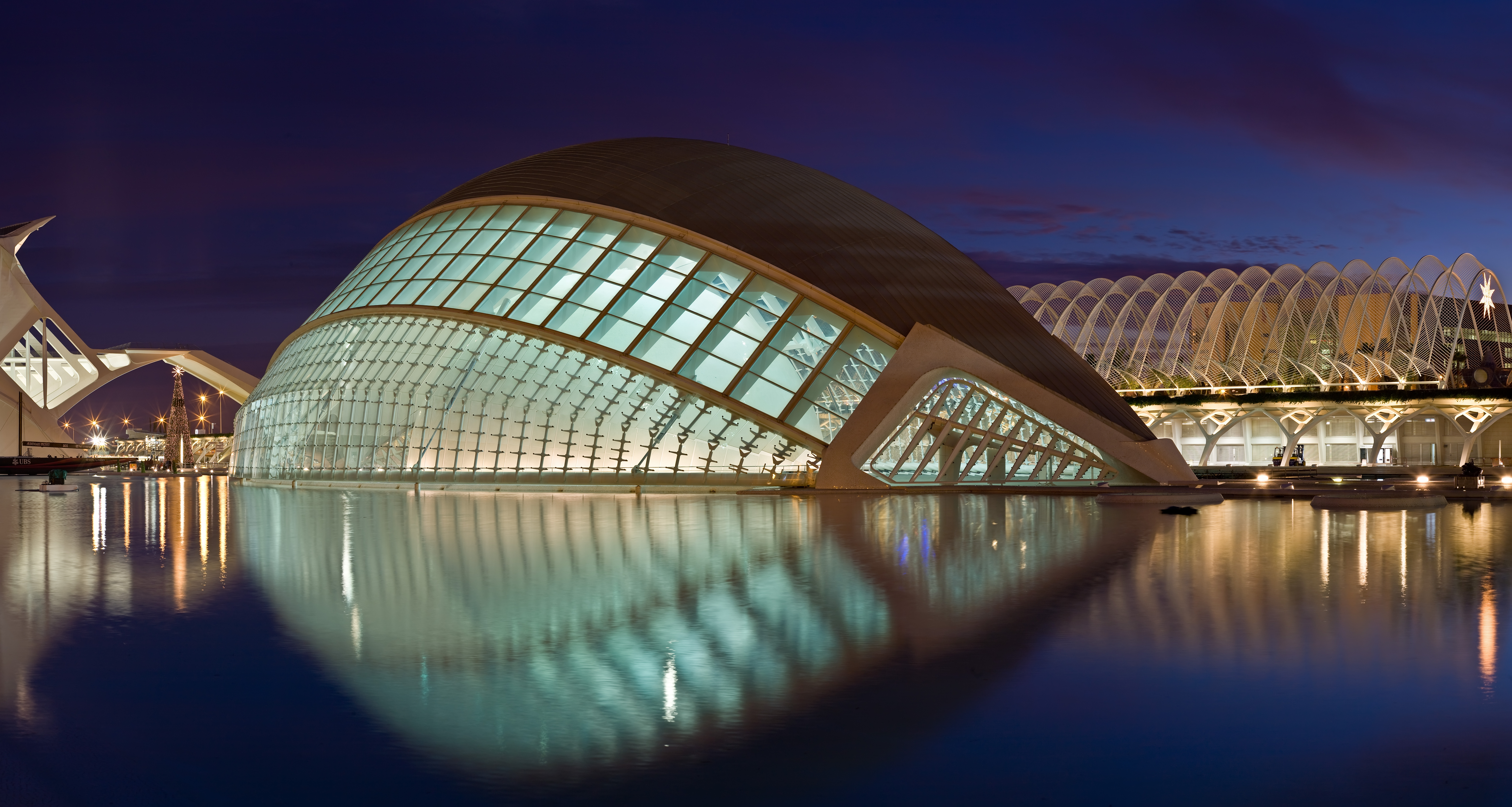
Ciutat de les Arts i les Ciències in Valencia, Spain

In April 1998 the second Ben-Al Party was held, attracting 5 times the number of participants and national media attention to the gaming event. EnRED abandoned the project as it grew, and in April 1999 Paco Regageles along with Belinda Galiano, Yolanda Rueda, Charles Pinto, Pablo Antón, Juanma Moreno and Rafa Revert founded the non-profit organization E3 Futura, with the broader objective of making technology in all forms more accessible to society. Asociación E3 Futura founded Futura Networks to organize the Campus Party festivals, Campus IT Summer University and the Cibervoluntariado digital inclusion movement.

In 2000 Manuel Toharia, a speaker at previous Campus Parties, and director of Príncipe Felipe's Museum of Sciences in Valencia's City of arts and Sciences suggested that Ragageles expand and make the event more international by moving it to the famous museum. That year, Campus Party doubled in size, attracting 1,600 participants to the 6-day festival.

=== Futura Networks ===
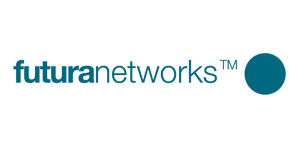
Futura Networks' logo

Futura Networks was founded by the non-profit E3 Futura in 1999 to create forums and educational programs, such as Campus Party, to promote innovation and responsible participation in digital culture. Their headquarters are in Madrid, Spain with satellite offices in Colombia, Mexico, Brazil, London. Futura Networks employs 87 people, and hires approximately 20 local organizers and hundreds of volunteers for each Campus Party event.

== Content and focus ==
=== Something Better ===
Something Better is an initiative announced on January 17, 2011, at Campus Party Brazil by CP co-founder Paco Ragageles and José María Álvarez-Pallete, President of Telefónica Latin America. Its goals are to promote the idea that the "Internet isn't a network of computers, but a network of people" and to encourage responsible and proper use of the networks. Paco Ragageles said that the new initiative aims to start a movement of civic and social responsibility on the web that promotes innovation and collaboration, and addresses common issues such as Internet privacy, piracy, spam and cyberbullying. One of the reported objectives of Something Better is to create an Internet use education program through Ministries of Education globally.

The first development of Something Better is Geeks Sans Frontières, a volunteer ambassador program which is based on the concept of Médecins Sans Frontières. Their goal is to help foster growth of technology infrastructure and access to information in developing countries in order to facilitate the exchange of ideas between all communities and cultures. The first destinations for the project are Colombia and Ghana.

=== Free and Open Source Software ===
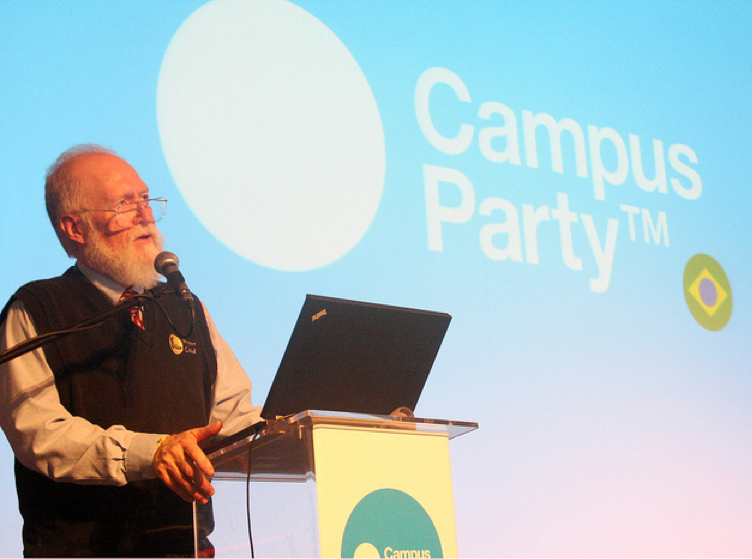
Jon "Maddog" Hall at Campus Party Brazil 2011

Free software is rooted in the origins of Campus Party. They believe that free and open source software is a "new way of writing the rules of digital society" and demonstrates a "profound change in the relationship between the industry, software creators and all who participate in the construction of a world where knowledge knows no boundaries." Some of the most popular events at the Campus are Linux and Ubuntu download fests where free software advocates can recruit new converts. Executive Director of Linux International, Jon "Maddog" Hall has spoken at the event four times, most recently in Brazil in 2011 to commemorate the 20th anniversary of Linux. In 2009 he created the multimedia "maddog challenge," a video contest sponsored by Telefónica to raise the awareness of free software and Creative Commons licenses.

=== Green Campus ===
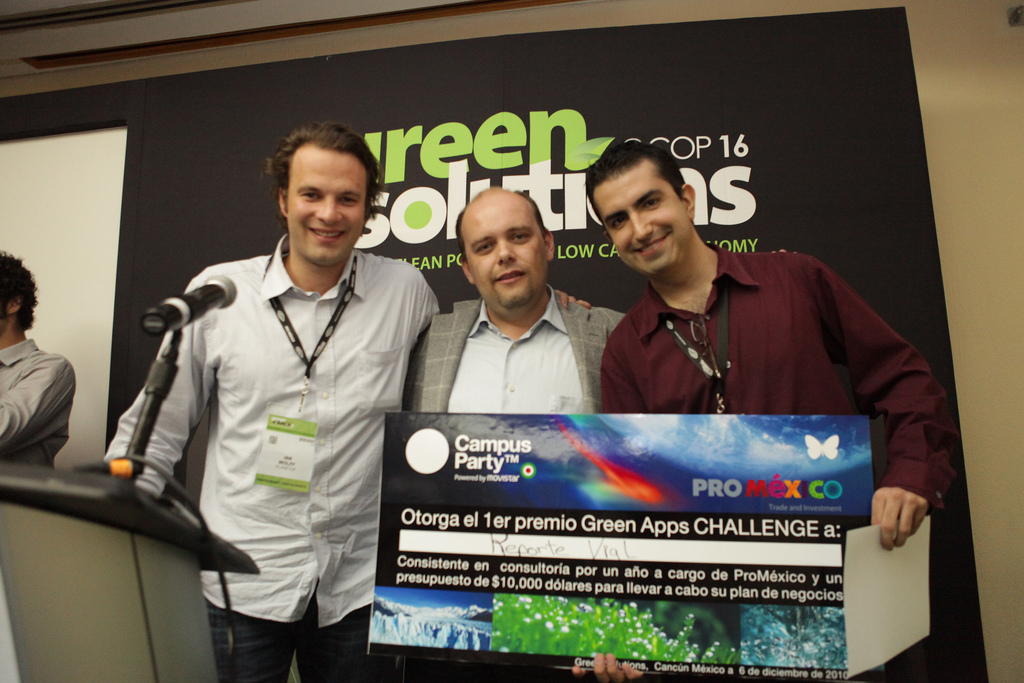
Winners of the Green Apps Business Challenge at CP Mexico 2010

Campus Party's Green Campus initiative began in 2007 with the goal of making the technology and construction of the event focused on green technology and improving the environment. The organization has made the commitment to reduce CO_{2} emissions, and to encourage innovation through sponsored competitions in the sectors of green tech. In 2007 Futura Networks planted a tree for every Campusero who attended the event with the Nature Foundation. Al Gore has attended the event twice to lead discussions and debates about climate change and responsible energy use. The Green Campus initiative asks for participation in their green tech projects and proposals for future programs.

=== Innovation ===
==== Software development ====
Campus Party is a hub for programmers and developers to share ideas and code. Participants have the opportunity to work with software, game, and application development teams through workshops and demos, and have the opportunity to present their own projects with programming enthusiasts.

==== Network and security ====
Campus Party holds debates, roundtables and talks related to network security vulnerabilities, new protocols, such as IPv6 and content privacy online. Ex-hacker turned computer security expert Kevin Mitnick has spoken at several editions about system vulnerabilities and how to protect content and systems, and Joaquín Ayuso, co-founder of Spanish social networking site Tuenti will present on ownership of personal information and security concerns on social platforms in Valencia in 2011.

==== Competitions ====
Each Campus Party edition has various competitions ranging from start-ups and multimedia presentations to app and game development. Campus Party Spain awards over $300,000 in prizes at each event.

=== Digital Inclusion ===
One of Campus Party's main missions is to bring the Internet to every citizen, and to bridge the digital divide in communities and countries most effected by lack of access. They hold activities focussed on addressing unequal access to information including "digital baptisms" for low-income groups, seminars, debates and about digital inclusion. Campus Party considers itself a "nucleus for digital inclusion" for less privileged populations through a program created with Telefónica and local public institutions. So far they report that the program has initiated over 30,000 people from Brazil, Colombia, Spain and Mexico in the use of information technologies since the program's founding in 2008.

The program works with educators to create programs addressing digital inequalities and training in information technology systems for companies, primarily in Ibero-American countries.

== Organization ==
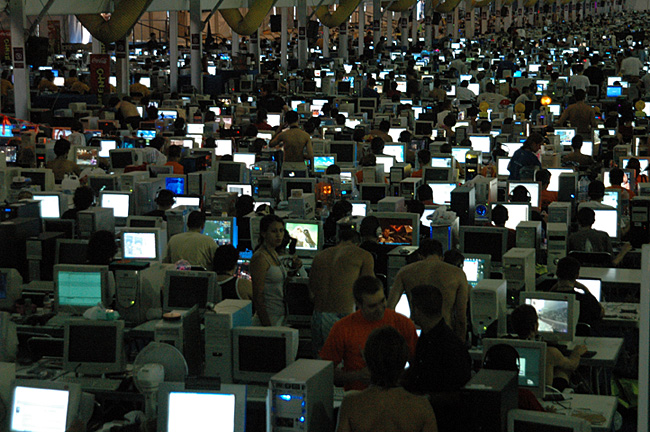
Computers set up at Campus Party 2004

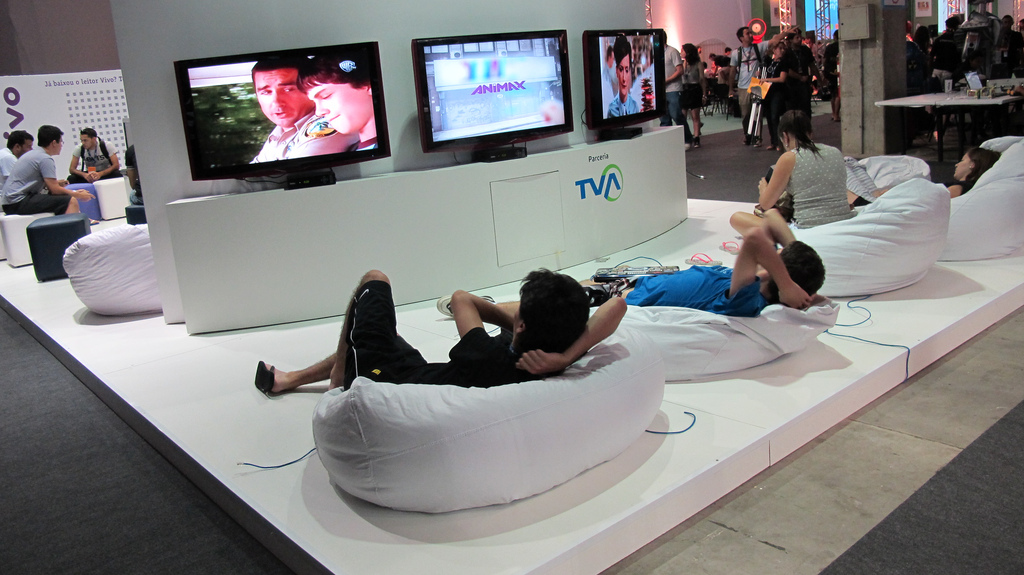
"Campuseros" take a break and watch some TV. Brazil 2011

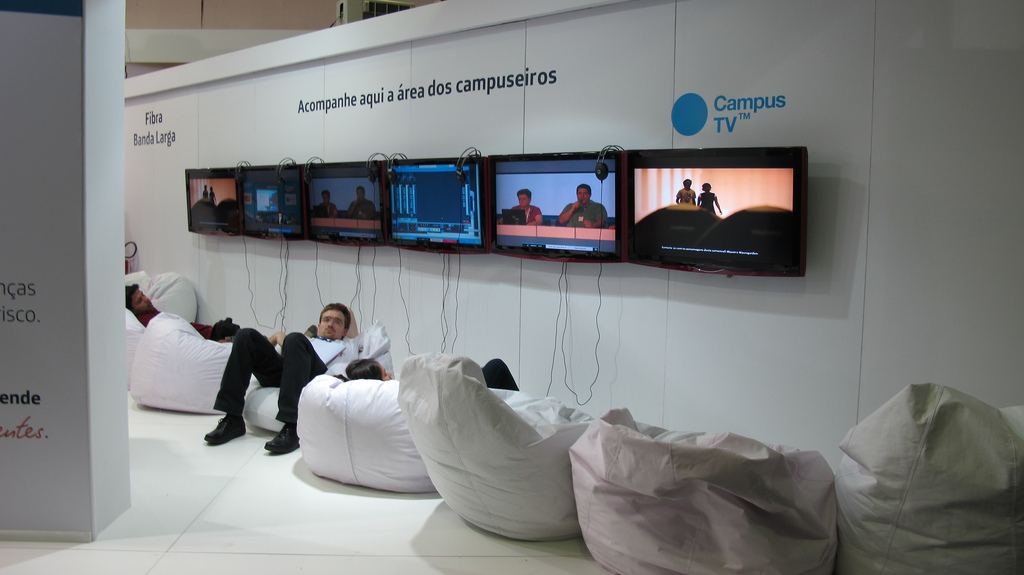
CampusTV live streaming talks in Brazil 2011

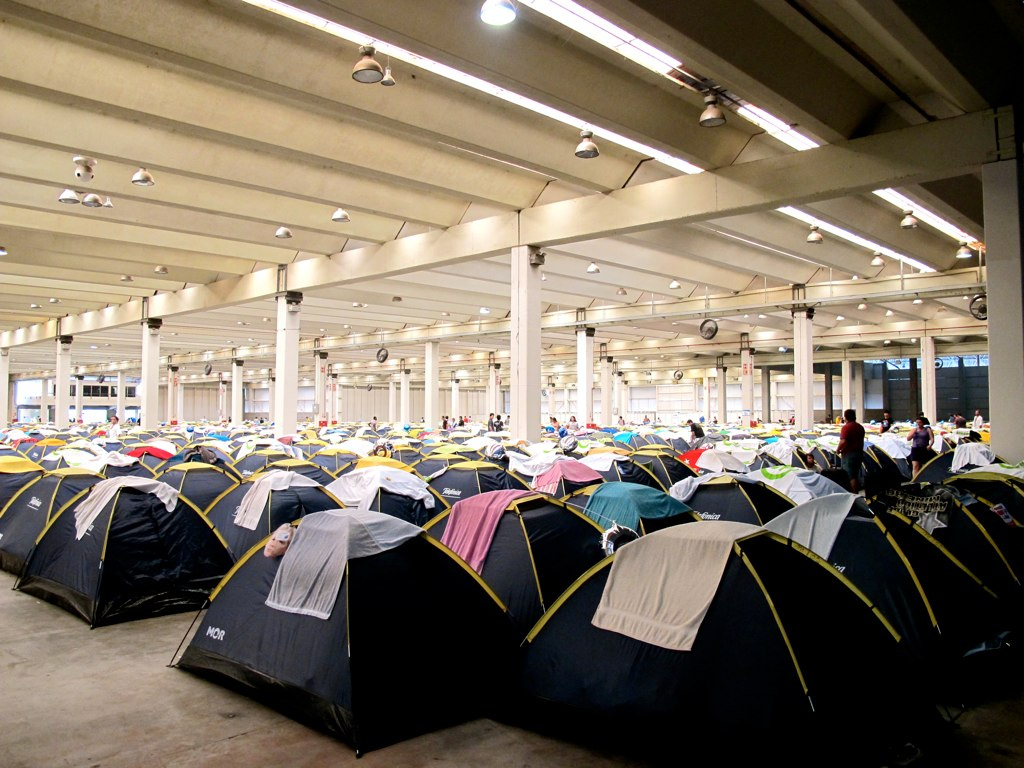
Tents at the Campus Party Village in Brazil 2011

Campus Party is typically held in large indoor arenas and split into 3 areas: the "Arena" area, - a 24/7 meeting place for talks, workshops, challenges, hackathons, call for ideas and special activities -, the "Experience" area - a place for startups and makers, games, simulators, robots and drones, virtual and augmented reality, academic projects, and more -, and the "Village" area which includes camping, restaurants and a dining hall, and a relaxation zone that has couches, bean bags, TVs and gaming consoles, free massages and in Valencia, a sport arena with basketball and football fields.

The stages are split into areas of concentration

- Science: astronomy, modeling and simulations
- Creativity: design, social media, photography, art and music
- Innovation: programming, security and networks
- Technology/Coding
- Entrepreneurship
- Digital Entertainment

Campus Party attracts a wide audience of gamers, programmers, technology enthusiasts, online communities and industry experts; however, the primary demographic is male college students between the ages of 18 and 29. Participants refer to themselves as "Campuseros" creating a tight-knit community and attending Campus Party each year to reconnect with friends. Attendees are encouraged to bring their own computer as the event centers largely around online participation, computers are provided on-site, but are often in high demand. Campuseros bring both laptops and desktop computers and set up on tables in the center of the exposition hall.

Most participants camp out on site for the seven-day festival in the Campus Party Village where they can be part of the event 24 hours a day. The tents are included in the price of admission. The village features restaurants, microwaves, showers, lockers, gaming and sport arenas and rest areas with couches and beanbags for those needing a break.

The event is live streamed and videos are posted on YouTube, and it is also covered on blogs and social media.

== Speakers ==
Campus Party has had a wide range of speakers in its history, including ex-US Vice President Al Gore, scientist Stephen Hawking, the inventor of the World Wide Web Sir Tim Berners-Lee, Steve Wozniak, co-founder of Apple, Vint Cerf, Vice President and Chief Internet Evangelist of Google, the hackers Kevin Mitnick and George Hotz, Akira Yamaoka, Ben Hammersley, Nolan Bushnell, the film directors Alfonso Cuarón and Víctor Pérez, Federico Faggin, the physicist who invented the touchscreen, the touchpad and the first commercially produced microchip, Neil Harbisson and Moon Ribas, the first people in the world to be recognised as cyborgs, Don Tapscott, etc.

The focus on astronomy at the event has drawn astronauts Neil Armstrong, Jean-François Clervoy, Ellen Baker, Buzz Aldrin, Marcos Pontes, and Rodolfo Neri Vela to Campus Party.

The organization's work with bridging the digital divide has attracted politicians and government figures, including High Commissioner for the United Nations for the Millennium Objective Eveline Herfkens, Neelie Kroes, Brazilian Presidential candidates Marina Silva and Dilma Rousseff, Gilberto Gil, a Grammy Award-winning musician and former Brazilian Minister of Culture, and ex-Mayor of New York City, Rudolph Giuliani.

President of the Robotics Society of America, David Calkins, video game industry icon Tommy Tallarico, founding member of Blizzard Entertainment, Frank Pearce, media theorist Don Tapscott, and Linux International Executive Director Jon "maddog" Hall have all spoken at the event.

== Editions ==
=== Campus Party Spain ===
The Spanish edition of Campus Party has been held at the Colegio Miguel Hernández, Ceulaj, and the Municipal Sport Arena of Benalmádena in Málaga, Spain; and at both the Valencia County Fair and the City of Arts and Sciences in Valencia over the past 15 years.

==== 2011 ====
In July 2011 the 15th edition of Campus Party Spain will be held at the City of Arts and Sciences in Valencia. Over $350,000 will be awarded for competition winners during the week-long event. Kevin Mitnick, David Calkins, Amira Al Hussaini, Carlos Schmukler, Gianluca Fratellini, Jon "Maddog" Hall, David O'Reilly, Stuart Clark, Julien Fourgeaud and David Bravo are confirmed speakers at the event.

=== Expansion ===
In 2008 the Campus Party crossed the Atlantic Ocean to be celebrated in the Americas, the first Latin American edition was held in São Paulo in February, and the second in Bogotá in June of the same year. Since 2008 the festival has been held annually in Brazil, Colombia and Mexico, with a special Ibero-America edition in El Salvador in October 2008. In 2011 Futura Networks announced they will be founding Campus Parties in Ecuador, Venezuela, and the United States.

=== Campus Party Brazil ===
Campus Party's first edition in São Paulo was held at the São Paulo Art Biennial. From 2009 until 2011 it has taken place at the Centro de Exposições Imigrantes. The 2012 edition was relocated to Parque Anhembi, in order to better accommodate the ever-growing public.

==== 2008 ====
The first Latin American edition of Campus Party took place at the São Paulo Art Biennial and drew 3,000 people to the event. The party was connected by a 5.5GB network, and featured 360 official activities including presentations, workshops, debates and competitions. Numerous government and educational institutions and NGOs participated in the event. Major presenters included Jon "Maddog" Hall, MariMoon Marcos Pontes and Steven Berlin Johnson.

==== 2009 ====
In January 2009 Campus Party Brazil was held at the Center Exposições Imigrantes, and attended by 6,655 Campuseros. The event featured a 10GB connection, 11 different content areas and a total of 468 activities throughout the week. The event was headlined by Sir Tim Berners-Lee, the inventor of the World Wide Web, who spoke about the universality of the Internet and "web 3.0." Demi Getschko, who has been involved in the creation of the international networking since 1987 and was part of the team that created the first Internet connection in Brazil. Gilberto Gil, Brazil's former culture minister, spoke about technology's role in government and brought his guitar along for a concert. Jon "Maddog" Hall, challenged the campuseros to make their own creations multimedia music and video using only free software under the Creative Commons licensing policy. The public open exhibition zone was attended by 119,000 people, and 6,819 of the attendees attended the Digital Inclusion area where they had the opportunity to learn more about the world of computers, the web and information technology.

==== 2010 ====
Creative Commons unveiled Version 3.0 of the Creative Commons licenses at Campus Party 2010. The new license is translated and adapted to Brazilian Law, and introduced a range of improvements without changing the licenses' basic structure or function. The keynote was given by Creative Commons' Lawrence Lessig and Brazil's Campus Party director, Ronaldo Lemos.

==== 2011 ====
Brazil's 4th Campus Party took place from January 17–23 at the Centro Imigrantes exposition hall. Over 6,800 Campuseros, primarily between the ages of 18 and 29, attended the event on a 10GB connection, over 1,000 times faster than a typical home connection, which was sponsored by Telefonica, the Brazilian Federal Government, and São Paulo City Government.

The content of the event was split into five main areas: science, creativity, innovation, digital entertainment, and the campus forum which includes open debates, and start-up competitions.

Campus Party founder Paco Ragageles and José María Álvarez-Pallete, President of Telefónica Latin America announced the Something Better initiative at the event, and Al Gore and Sir Tim Berners-Lee shared the stage to discuss the early days of the web and to discuss their visions for its future.

Digital inclusion was a major topic at the event, as only a quarter of Brazilians have Internet access at home, and just over 40% of the population has a home computer. A panel including Brazilian Communications Minister Paulo Bernardo discussed the need to improve the infrastructure of mobile and web networks.

The event sponsored 27 competitions from FIFA championships to modeling and Astrophotography, with awards to future events and funding for technology related start-ups. Steve Wozniak keynoted the event, speaking to the over 6,000 Campuseros about his history as a developer and the founding of the Electronic Frontier Foundation.

The first Startups Contest was organized that year, a joint action with TV Globo, having been awarded 5 finalists with the winning prize.

More code, video, photos and blogs were uploaded than downloaded during the event, with network traffic peaking at 3 am each morning.

==== 2012 ====
Campus Party Brasil 5 took place from February 6–11 at Anhembi exposition hall. The bandwidth were upgraded to a 20Gb connection sponsored by Telefonica, PRODESP, the Brazilian Federal Government, São Paulo State Government and São Paulo City Government.

==== 2013 ====
The sixth edition of the event took place from January 28 to February 3 at Anhembi exposition hall. With a 30Gb connection sponsored by Telefonica and 500 hours of content, including keynotes by Buzz Aldrin and Nolan Bushnell, the event attracted 7,631 Campuseros. The official hashtag on Twitter was #cpbr6.

=== Campus Party Colombia ===
Campus Party is held annually at the Bogotá Corferias Convention Center in Bogotá.

==== 2009 ====
Campus Party Colombia 2009 took place from July 6 to 12, 2009, with 3,671 Campuseros attending the event, which featured over 300 hours of training, workshops and collaborative activities.

Speakers and attendees included Kevin Mitnick, famous hacker turned network security expert, Linux International Executive Director Jon "Maddog" Hall, founding member of Creative Commons Michael Carroll, and President of Wikimedia Argentina, Patricio Lorente, who led a conference about Wikipedia.

The open public area, which included interactive zones, educational workshops and virtual reality and gaming expositions, was attended by over 90,000 visitors during the week.

In a partnership with the Mayor of Bogotá and the Ministry of Economic Development, Campus Party trained 8,400 people through their Digital Baptism program. The program offers workshops and sessions where people become familiar with available software and applications to help innovate new forms of interaction and communication. In a joint effort with the Ministry of Education, 130 teachers from across Colombia came together to share their experiences and brainstorm access to knowledge and technological resources for use in the classroom.

=== Campus Party Ibero-America ===
Campus Party Ibero-America was sponsored by the Secretary General of Ibero-America as part of the official agenda of the 18th Ibero-America Summit of Heads of State and Government. The event took place from October 28 to November 1, 2008, in the Sports City Merlot in San Salvador, El Salvador, and brought together 600 Internet enthusiasts from 22 countries and 2,000 digital literacy visitors to share their expertise and interests to find solutions to close the technological gap and improving social conditions and development in their countries.

Speakers included government representatives Antonio Saca, President of El Salvador, Secretary General of the SEGIB, Enrique Iglesias, and Eugenio Ravinet, Secretary General of the Iberoamerican Youth Organization, whose talks focused on technology appropriation, or how people shape technology to make it their own.

Astronaut Marcos Pontes, Mexican director Alfonso Cuaron, and Spanish video game developer Gonzo Suarez spoke at the event as well.

=== Campus Party México ===
Campus Party's Mexico City edition began in 2009, and has been held at the Expo Santa Fe Center.

==== 2009 ====
Mexico's first Campus Party took place on November 12–16 at the Bancomer Convention Center with 3,527 Campuseros, and 20,000 visitors to the public expo. Guests included Tim Berners-Lee the inventor of the World Wide Web, Jon "maddog" Hall, president of Linux International, and Rodolfo Neri Vela, the first Mexican to travel to space, among others. The event clocked in at over 250 hours of collaborative activities and workshops, supplied a 8Gb network, and hosted 1,500 campers.

==== 2010 ====
The second edition of the event was from August 9–15 and hosted almost double the number of attendees with 6,519 registered Campuseros.

Steve Wozniak, co-founder of Apple, Kevin Mitnick, Akira Yamaoka, Ben Hammersley and Wikimedia Foundation's Head of Business Partnerships Kul Wadhwa spoke at the event.

The event featured 27 competitions such as Iron Geek, whose winner received a three-month contract with Telefónica in Spain, the PEMEX Energy Innovation Award, The Great Mind Challenge sponsored by IBM, Mobile Modding and VoIP Hacker Challenges. And in honor of the 2010 FIFA World Cup in South Africa, a football match played my robots was held for two nights on the main stage.

=== European Union edition ===
The Campus Party Europe was held April 14–18, 2010 at the Caja Mágica in Madrid, Spain with 800 participants from each of the 27 European Union member states. Sponsored by the Spanish Ministry for Science and Innovation and the European Commission, the event was held in conjunction with the Spanish Presidency of the European Union and centered around three areas of knowledge: science, digital creativity and innovation. Costs for transportation and accommodations were covered by Futura Networks for all 800 participants.

The world's biggest robot building society, Let's Make Robots, was invited to provide an international focus on robot building as a hobby. Students from northern Portugal's Braga University built football playing robots to kick a ball around with Cristiano Ronaldo and Raúl González in celebration of the 2010 World Cup.

The European Union event featured competitions that university students and industry professionals could enter, and showcased inventions from a computer-toaster hybrid to a video game to promote healthy eating habits in children.

The major sponsored competitions included:

- Innovation Awards: Winner - "The foot APM" by Bram Vanderborght, Belgium, a passive prosthesis that doesn't require external power as energy is stored and released. It closely imitates the best possible functioning normal ankle.
- MICINN Challenge: Winner: MobileDoc - a database of services and doctor expertises and application developed with graphics to be easily localized and isn't limited by illiteracy, that instantly finds nearby hospitals or medicine men in locations where emergency care is scarce, such as Nigeria.
- Imagine Cup - Sponsored by Microsoft as the largest international student competition focusing on software technological innovation that leads to a better world. Microsoft created an honorary mention for Campus Party participants. The winners had the opportunity to present their creations at a European Union seminar to corporate representatives and Internet entrepreneurs.
- FIRST Latam - A European Union funded project that aims to foster the development of Internet innovation in Latin America through international cooperation. FIRST holds competitions for individuals to present their proposals for future projects and then finds resources and funding for the projects.

Due to the volcanic eruption in Iceland, the party ended up with a massive challenge for the organisers, who had to arrange return trips the 800 stranded European participants, without any flights available.

=== Campus Party Europe in Berlin ===
From August 21 to 26, 2012 Campus Party held its first edition in Germany at Berlin's Tempelhof airport. The event, which is under patronage of the European Commission is said to have drawn 10,000 participants from all 27 countries in the European Union. Among the main speakers: Paulo Coelho, Tim Berners-lee, Don Tapscott, and Neil Harbisson.

==== Criticism ====
The event was criticized in advance for not being involved with the local hacker, gamer and policial activist scenes. Alcohol was banned on the venue, except in VIP areas.

=== Campus Party Europe in London ===
From September 2 to 7 2013, the first Campus Party in the UK was held at The O2 in London.

=== Campus Party Italy ===
The first edition of Campus Party Italy, the international festival that focuses on creativity and innovation, was held in Milan (Fiera Milano Congressi MiCo) in July 2017.

The event included over 2,000 campuseros (participants in tent) and 400 hours of content featured on 7 stages: business, coding, creativity, entertainment, technology, science and Feel The Future, the main stage. Among the main speakers: Federico Faggin, the physicist who invented the touchscreen, the touchpad and the first commercially produced microchip, Neil Harbisson and Moon Ribas, the first people in the world to be recognised as cyborgs, Roberto Saviano, author of Gomorra and journalist Enrico Mentana.

The second edition was hosted in Milan from 18 to 22 July 2018. Five days (and four nights) non-stop, 4,000 tents, 7 stages, 20,000 visitors expected, 350 speakers from all over the world, 450 hours of content, more than 130 partners including companies, institutions, communities and universities. Among the main speakers: Guido Tonelli, physicist talking about the CMS project at CERN that discovered the Higgs Boson; Jon “Maddog” Hall, the board chair for the Linux Professional Institute; Edward Frenkel, mathematics professor from the University of Berkeley in California and author of the bestseller Love and Math and George Hotz, programmer and hacker from the US, the first to jailbreak the iPhone 3S and to hack the PlayStation 3. Amond the speakers of the thematic stages (science, entrepreneurship, coding, entertainment and creativity): Víctor Pérez, film director who worked on the special effects of Harry Potter and the Deathly Hallows and Rogue One: A Star Wars Story; James Hughes, executive director of the Institute for Ethics and Emerging Technologies and author of Citizen Cyborg: Why Democratic Societies Must Respond to the Redesigned Human of the Future, and more.

The third edition was held in Milan from 24 to 27 July 2019. It was a four days and four nights non-stop event with 450 hours of content, 4,000 tents, 20,000 visitors, 250 speakers from all over the world and more of 180 partners among institutions, companies, universities and communities. To celebrate the 30th anniversary of the World Wide Web, Campus Party invited Sir Tim Berners-Lee as keynote speakers to talk about the future of the Internet. Concurrent with the announcement of the presence of the inventor of the WWW, Campus Party launched a global call for ideas entitled "WORLD WIDE WE_", a study developed together with Kantar that will involve the entire network of 650,000 young campuseros from 14 countries. Everyone was invited to share their ideas for a better web with Campus Party and the inventor of the www, like how to combat fake news and the phenomenon of hate speech, proposals for new methods of website maintenance and ideas for defending privacy. Four finalists presented their ideas directly to Sir Tim Berners-Lee in front of 4,000 young campuseros at the event, inspiring them to give even more in terms of ideas and projects, in the unique and distinctive manner of Campus Party.

=== Campus Party TechFest (Detroit, USA) ===
The first USA edition of Campus Party was scheduled from 6 to 8 of November 2020 at TCF Center in Detroit, Michigan but due to the COVID pandemic the event was postponed.

The conference will include workshops, demonstrations, hackathons, gaming and other activities, as well as keynote speakers such as Daymond John of reality television show "Shark Tank".

== Campus Party editions ==
Date	Location	Venue	Campuseros/Participants	Main speakers
August 8–10, 1997	Benalmádena, Málaga, Spain	Colegio Miguel Hernández	50	
August 8–10, 1997	Mollina, Málaga, Spain	Ceulaj	250	
August 1998	Benalmádena, Málaga, Spain	Municipal Sport Arena of Benalmádena	250	
July 31 – August 2, 1998	Mollina, Málaga, Spain	Ceulaj	500	
August 2–8, 1999	Mollina, Málaga, Spain	Ceulaj	650	
August 7–13, 2000	Valencia, Spain	Príncipe Felipe Science Museum in the City of Arts and Sciences	1,600	Manuel Toharia
August 7–10, 2001	Valencia, Spain	Príncipe Felipe Science Museum in the City of Arts and Sciences	1,600	Al Gore, Nicholas Negroponte
August 5–11, 2002	Valencia, Spain	City of Arts and Sciences	3,000	
July 27–31, 2004	Valencia, Spain	City of Arts and Sciences	4,500	Yago Lamela
July 25–31, 2005	Valencia, Spain	Valencia County Fair	5,500	Neil Armstrong, Kevin Warwick
July 24–30, 2006	Valencia, Spain	Valencia County Fair	5,500	Stephen Hawking, Eveline Herfkens, Tom Kalil, Rudolph Giuliani, David Calkins, Frank Pearce, Stefano Maffulli, Raúl Albiol, Juan Carlos Ferrero
July 23–29, 2007	Valencia, Spain	Valencia County Fair	8,100	Jon "Maddog" Hall, Mark Shuttleworth, Tommy Tallarico, Jani Pönkkö, Barbara Lippe, Jun Ho Oh, Marcelo Tossati, Kimiko Ryokai
February 11–17, 2008	São Paulo, Brazil	São Paulo Art Biennial	3,000	Jon "Maddog" Hall, Mari Moon, Marcos Pontes Steven Berlin Johnson, Heather Camp
June 23–29, 2008	Bogotá, Colombia	Bogotá Corferias Convention Center	2,430	Jon "Maddog" Hall, Vander Caballero
July 28 – August 3, 2008	Valencia, Spain	Valencia County Fair	8,973	Tim Berners-Lee, Jean-François Clervoy, Mary Hodder, Tony Guntharp, Rosalía Lloret
October 28 – November 1, 2008	El Salvador Special Ibero-America edition	Polideportivo Ciudad Merliot	600	Alfonso Cuarón, Gonzo Suárez
July 6–12, 2009	Bogotá, Colombia	Bogotá Corferias Convention Center	3,671	Michael W. Carroll, Jordan Powell Hargrave, Kevin Mitnick
January 19–25, 2009	São Paulo, Brazil	Centro Imigrantes	6,655	Demi Getschko, Gilberto Gil, Lobão, Tim Berners-Lee
July 27 – August 2, 2009	Valencia, Spain	City of Arts and Sciences	6,077	Ellen Baker, Nacho Vigalondo, Paulina Bozek, Rodrigo Blass
November 12–16, 2009	Mexico City, Mexico	Bancomer Convention Center	3,527	Neri Vela, Jon "Maddog" Hall, Tim Berners-Lee
January 25–31, 2010	São Paulo, Brazil	Centro Imigrantes	6,500	Lawrence Lessig, Gilberto Gil, Luiz Fernando Pezao, Danese Cooper
April 14–18, 2010	Madrid, Spain Special European Edition	Caja Mágica	800	Jean-François Clervoy, Stuart Clark
July 26 – August 1, 2010	Valencia, Spain	City of Arts and Sciences	6,077	Jean-François Clervoy, Stuart Clark, Karlheinz Brandenburg, Paul Bennett
August 9–15, 2010	Mexico City, Mexico	Bancomer Convention Center	6,519	Jesus Ramirez, Octavío Ruíz Cervera, Akira Yamaoka
January 17–23, 2011	São Paulo, Brazil	Centro Imigrantes	6,800	Al Gore, Steve Wozniak, Tim Berners-Lee, Ben Hammersley, Jon "Maddog" Hall, Kul Wadhwa, Stephen Crocker
June 27 – July 3, 2011	Bogotá, Colombia	Bogotá Corferias Convention Center	4,500	Tan Le, Mark Leon, John Draper
June 27 – July 3, 2011	Bogotá, Colombia	TBA	-	Jon "Maddog" Hall, Neil Harbisson, Julien Fourgeaud,
July 11–17, 2011	Valencia, Spain	City of Arts and Sciences	6,500	Kevin Mitnick, Ferran Adrià, Julien Fourgeaud
July 18–24, 2011	Mexico City, Mexico	Expo Santa Fe	7,500	Al Gore, Tim Berners-Lee, Vint Cerf, Ray Kurzweil, Jon "Maddog" Hall
October 12–16, 2011	Special Edition - Campus Party Milenio Granada, Spain	FERMASA	600	Wael Abbas, Ibn Sina Robot
September 19–23, 2011	Quito, Ecuador	Cemexpo	2,000	Neil Harbisson, Kevin Mitnick, Amira Al Hussaini, Mauricio Estrella, Melonee Wise, Jon "Maddog" Hall
February 6–12, 2012	São Paulo, Brazil	Anhembi Parque	-	Andreu Vea, Jon "Maddog" Hall, Sugata Mitra, David Haynes, Neil Harbisson, Kul Wadhwa, Sebastian Alegría Klocker, Alex Belos, Julien Fourgeaud, Michio Kaku,
July 30-August 4, 2012	Mexico City, Mexico	Bancomer Convention Center	7,000	-
August 21–26, 2012	Berlin, Germany	Berlin Tempelhof Airport	10,000	Tim Berners-Lee, Paulo Coelho, Don Tapscott, Neil Harbisson, Jon "Maddog" Hall, Julien Fourgeaud
January 28–03, 2013	São Paulo, Brazil	Anhembi Parque	8,000	Buzz Aldrin
July 17–21, 2013	Recife, Brazil	Chevrolet Hall	2,000	Dale Stephens, Benito Muros
September 2–7, 2013	London, United Kingdom	The O2	10,000	Sandy Pentland, Jon "Maddog" Hall, Nolan Bushnell, David Rowan
July 18–24, 2013	Mexico City, Mexico	Bancomer Convention Center	8,929	Buzz Aldrin, Nolan Bushnell
July 22–27, 2014	Recife, Brazil	Centro de Convenções de Pernambuco	4,000	Daniel Sierberg, Daniel Matros, Jon "Maddog" Hall
January 27 – February 2, 2014	São Paulo, Brazil	Anhembi Parque	8,000	Bruce Dickinson
June 24–29, 2014	Zapopan, Mexico	Expo Guadalajara	10,500	
July 23–26, 2015	Recife, Brazil	Centro de Convenções de Pernambuco	4,000/60,000	Dado Schneider, Lorrana Scarpioni, Leon Katsnelson, Joseph Olin
February 3–8, 2015	São Paulo, Brazil	Expo Imigrantes	8,000/100,000	
26–30 August 2015	San José, Costa Rica	Centro de Eventos Pedregal	-	
July 22–27, 2015	Zapopan, Mexico	Expo Guadalajara	15,000	Rodolfo Neri Vela
January 26–31, 2016	São Paulo, Brazil	Anhembi Parque	8,000/	
25–29 May 2016	Utrecht, The Netherlands	Jaarbeurs	4,000	
June 29 – July 3, 2016	Zapopan, Mexico	Expo Guadalajara	7,500/20,000	
August 20–21, 2016	Recife, Brazil	Chevrolet Hall	4,000	
October 26–30, 2016	Buenos Aires, Argentina	Tecnopolis	2,000	
November 9–13, 2016	Belo Horizonte, Brazil	ExpoMinas	2,000	
January 31 – February 5, 2017	São Paulo, Brazil	Anhembi Parque	8,000/80,000	
June 14–18, 2017	Brasilia, Brazil	Centro de Convenções Ulysses Guimarães	4,500	
July 5–9, 2017	Zapopan, Mexico	Expo Guadalajara	12,000/25,000	
July 20–23, 2017	Milan, Italy	MIco	1,200/6,000	Enrico Mentana; Federico Faggin; Francesco Pannofino; Neil Harbisson e Moon Ribas, Roberto Saviano
9–13 August 2017	Salvador de Bahia, Brazil	Arena Fonte Nova	6,000/80,000	
November 1–5, 2017	Belo Horizonte, Brazil	Expominas	6,000	
January 30 – February 4, 2018	São Paulo, Brazil	Anhembi	130,000	
April 11–15, 2018	Natal, Brazil	Natal Convention Center	60,000	
April 25–28, 2018	Buenos Aires, Argentina	Tecnópolis	8,502	
May 17–20, 2018	Salvador de Bahia, Brazil	Arena Fonte Nova	60,000	
June 27 – July 1, 2018	Brasilia, Brazil	Estádio Nacional de Brasília Mané Garrincha	3,500/100,000	
July 6–8, 2018	Singapore	Singapore Expo	1,918	
July 18–22, 2018	Milan, Italy	Rho Fiera MIlano	2,500/10,000	Enrico Mentana; Edward Frenkel; George Hotz; Guido Tonelli; Jon ‘Maddog’ Hall; Lena De Winne; Rob Spence; Marco Tempest
August 1–5, 2018	Rondonia, Brazil	Porto Velho	1,800/40,000	
23–24 Nov 2018	Misiones, Argentina	Posadas, Misiones	5,000	
7–10 Nov 2018	Minas Gerais, Brazil	Serraria Sousa Pinto	12,000/30,000	
12–17 Feb 2019	São Paulo, Brazil	Expo center Norte	12,000/130,000	
March 15–17, 2019	Punta del este, Uruguay	Centro de Convenciones de Punta del Este	5,000	
June 18–22, 2019	Bogota, Colombia	Corferias	50,000	
June 14–19, 2019	Brasilia, Brazil	Estádio Nacional de Brasília Mané Garrincha	9,000/100,000	
July 24–27, 2019	Milan, Italy	Rho Fiera MIlano	3,000/10,000	sir Tim Berners Lee, Gino Strada, Roberto Burioni, Aimee Van Wynsberghe, Valeria Cagnina, Adrian Fartade
August 14–18, 2019	Natal, Brazil	Centro de Convenciones de Natal	60,000	
4–8 September 2019	Goias, Brazil	Passeo das aguas	3,000/40,000	
4–6 October 2019	Luque, Paraguay	Centro de Convenciones de la Conmebol	8,000	Jon "Maddog" Hall, Neil Harbisson, Cris Morena, Thiago Lapp
18–22 March 2020 (edition postponed due to COVID-19)	Manaus, Brazil	Arena da Amazônia	—	
November 6–8, 2020	Detroit, Michigan (USA)	TCF Center	—	Daymond John, Dianna Cowern, Rodney Mullen
15-19 June 2022	Goiânia, Brazil	Passeio das Águas Shopping		
