= Julien Fourgeaud =

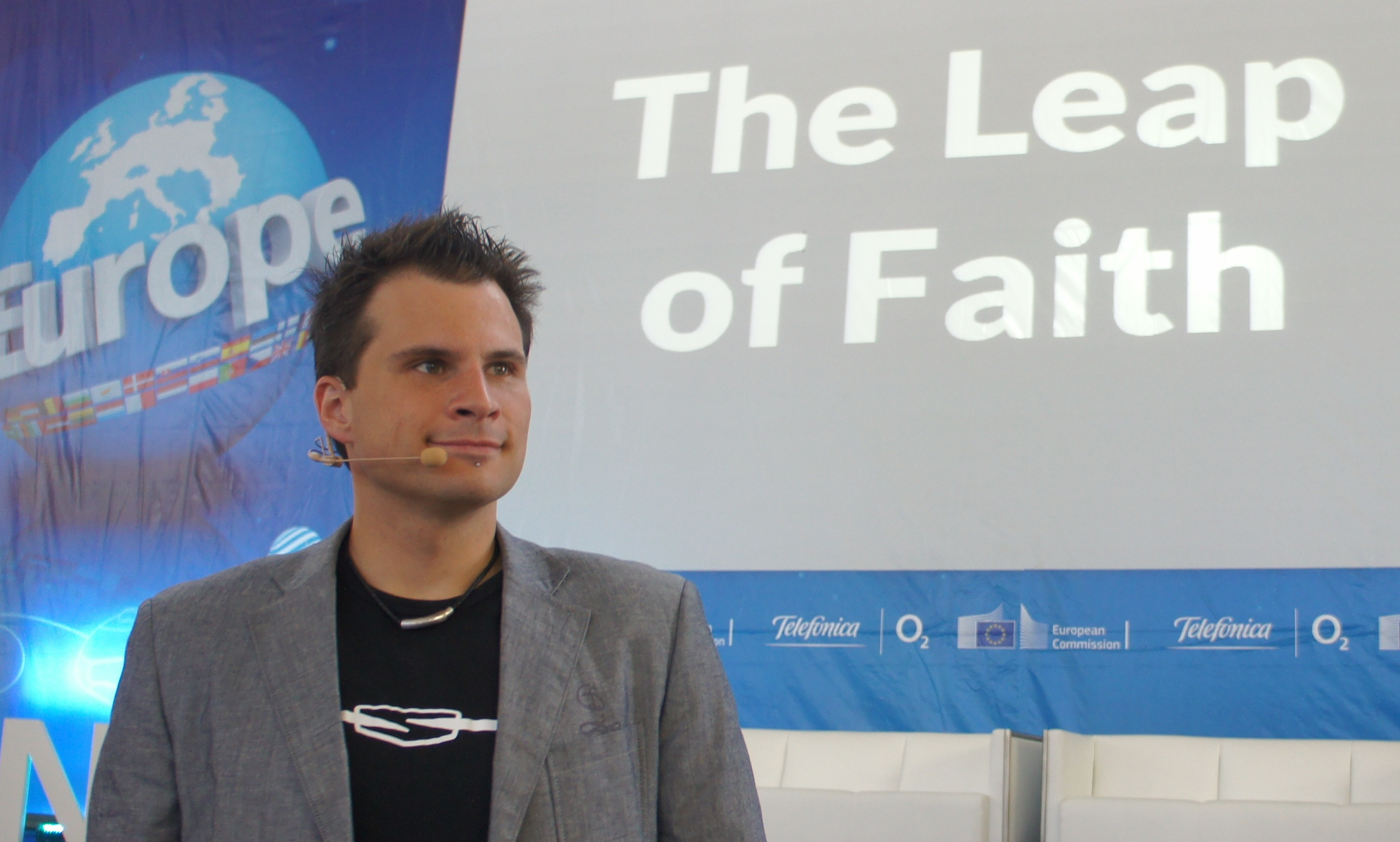
- Julien Fourgeaud at Campus Party Europe 2012, launching Scarlet Motors
- Born: 25 April 1980; Cluses, France
- Died: 6 August 2014 (aged 34); Magland, France
- Occupations: inventor, entrepreneur
- Known for: Co-founder of Scarlet Motors
- Title: CPO of Transfluent
- Website: https://twitter.com/julienfourgeaud/

Julien Fourgeaud (April 25, 1980 – August 6, 2014) ex-Rovio's digital services product strategist and co-founder of Scarlet Motors.

== Biography ==
His career began at Nokia, contributing in projects such ESeries and NSeries handsets, as the transition from keypad to touch interface, and leading the major effort behind third-party integration for the N97 in 2009, based on the Symbian OS, who was developed by a Symbian's community led by the Symbian Foundation who have Julien as their spokesperson.

At Rovio, Fourgeaud was involved in the development of new services and products.
