= Jon Hall (programmer) =

Programmer and major contributor to the Linux project (born 1950)

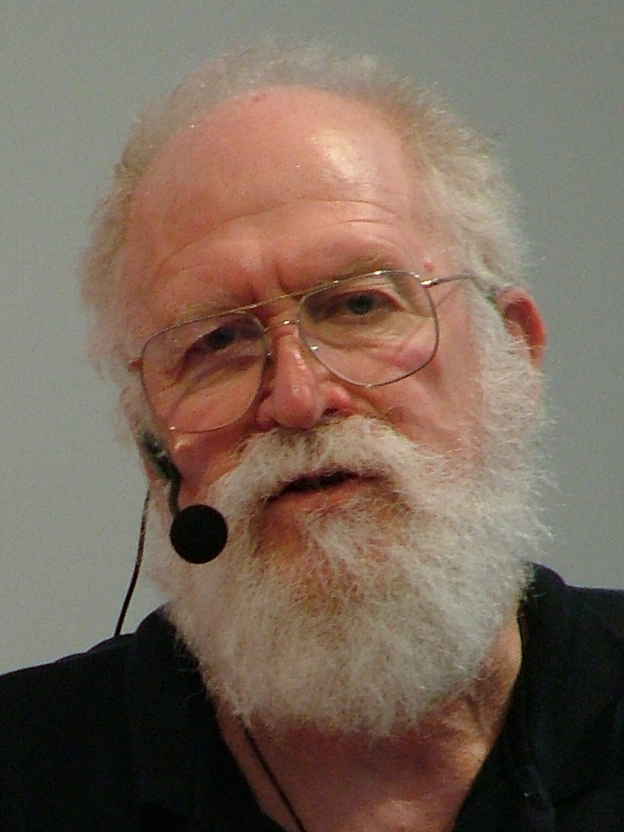
- Hall in 2015
- Born: August 7, 1950 (age 76)
- Other name: maddog
- Education: Master of Science, Computer Science; Rensselaer Polytechnic Institute, 1977; Bachelor of Science, Commerce and Engineering; Drexel University, 1973
- Employer: Linux Professional Institute
- Title: Board Chair

Jon "maddog" Hall (born 7 August 1950) is the board chair for the Linux Professional Institute.

== Early life ==
Hall helped his father assemble toys at a toy store, and had three years of experience working at his high school electronics shop.

== Career ==
The nickname "maddog" was given to him by his students at Hartford State Technical College, where he was the department head of Computer Science. He now prefers to be called by this name. According to Hall, his nickname "came from a time when I had less control over my temper".

He has worked for Western Electric Corporation, Aetna Life and Casualty, Bell Laboratories, Digital Equipment Corporation (Digital), VA Linux Systems, and Silicon Graphics (SGI). He was the CTO and ambassador of the now defunct computer appliance company Koolu.

It was during his time with Digital that he initially became interested in Linux and was instrumental in obtaining equipment and resources for Linus Torvalds to accomplish his first port, to Digital's Alpha platform. It was also in this general timeframe that Hall, who lives in New Hampshire, started the Greater New Hampshire Linux Users' Group. Hall has UNIX as his New Hampshire vanity license plate.

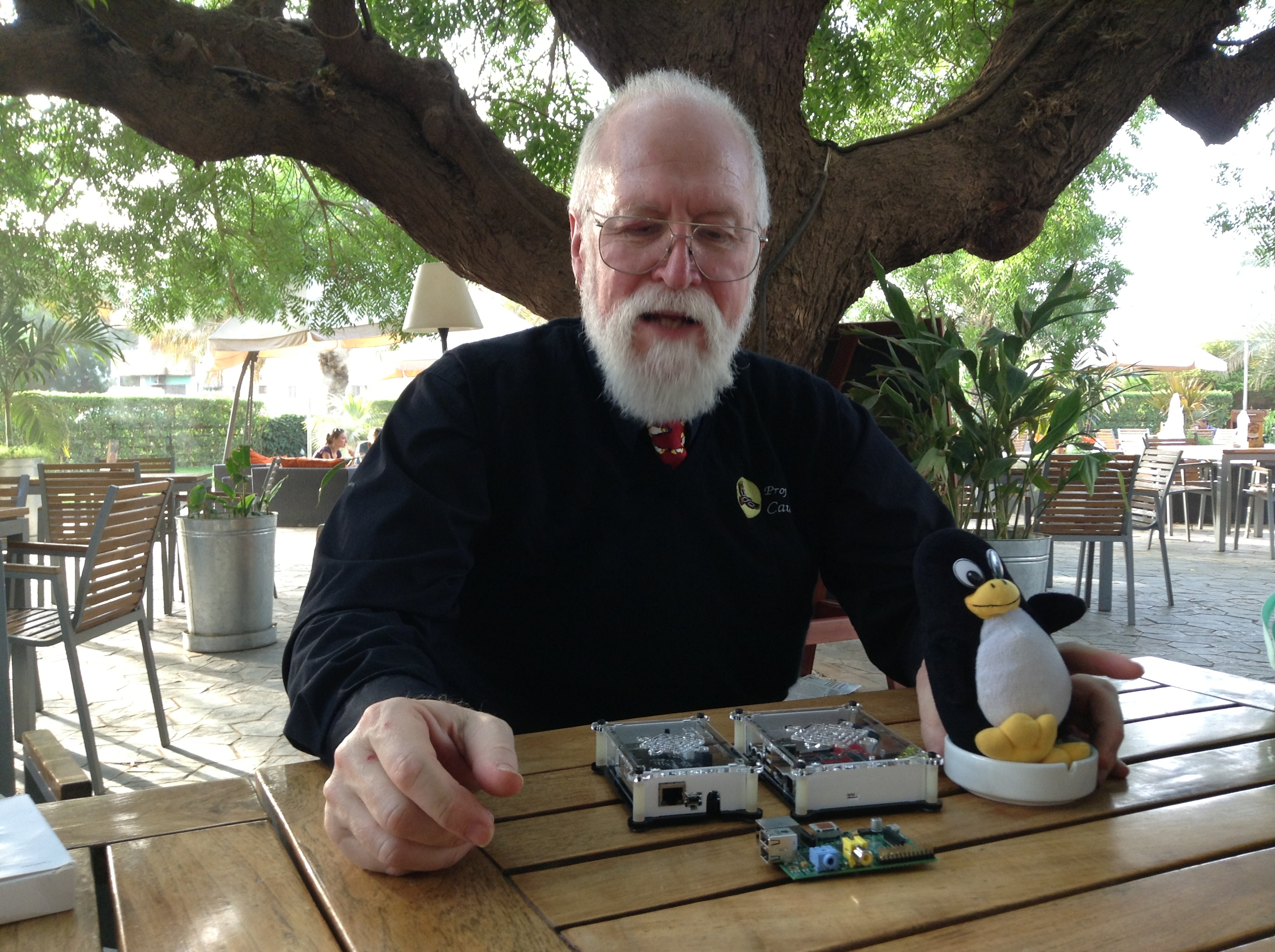
Jon Hall explaining gadgets

Hall serves or has served on the boards of several companies, and several non-profit organizations, including the USENIX Association. Hall has spoken about Linux and free software at the technology conference Campus Party many times since 2007.

Hall holds a Master of Science in computer science from Rensselaer Polytechnic Institute (1977) and a Bachelor of Science in commerce and engineering from Drexel University (1973).

In September 2015, Hall joined the board of The Linux Professional Institute, as chairman of the board.

He is the co-founder of Brazilian Internet of things and Single-board computer project called Caninos Loucos based on University of São Paulo.

== Advocacy ==
Hall has used his experience and name recognition to promote a variety of causes, generally involving open-source hardware or software in some fashion. In 2011 Hall gave talks and served on the planning committee for the leadership track of POSSCON in Columbia South Carolina.

Hall is the president and evangelist for Project Cauã, which he describes as "a project to help create millions of sustainable, private sector, entrepreneurial jobs in dense urban areas in Latin America". The project is based around an open hardware and software design for small, low power computers which will be the basis for small scale but widespread entrepreneurs using this platform to bring networking and entertainment to urban areas.

In 2013, Hall came on board as an advocate for the ARM 64-bit porting project being run by the Linaro group. The objective is to port a collection of Linux open-source libraries to the 64-bit ARM architecture (ARMv8).

In January 2022, Hall gave testimony in a New Hampshire subcommittee for the use of free and open source software for government use.

== Personal life ==
In June 2012, the day after Alan Turing's birthday, Hall published an article in Linux Magazine announcing that he was gay. He is the godfather to Linus Torvalds' children.
