= Museu de les Ciències Príncipe Felipe =

- Museu de les Ciències Príncep Felip (Valencian); Museo de las Ciencias Príncipe Felipe (Spanish)
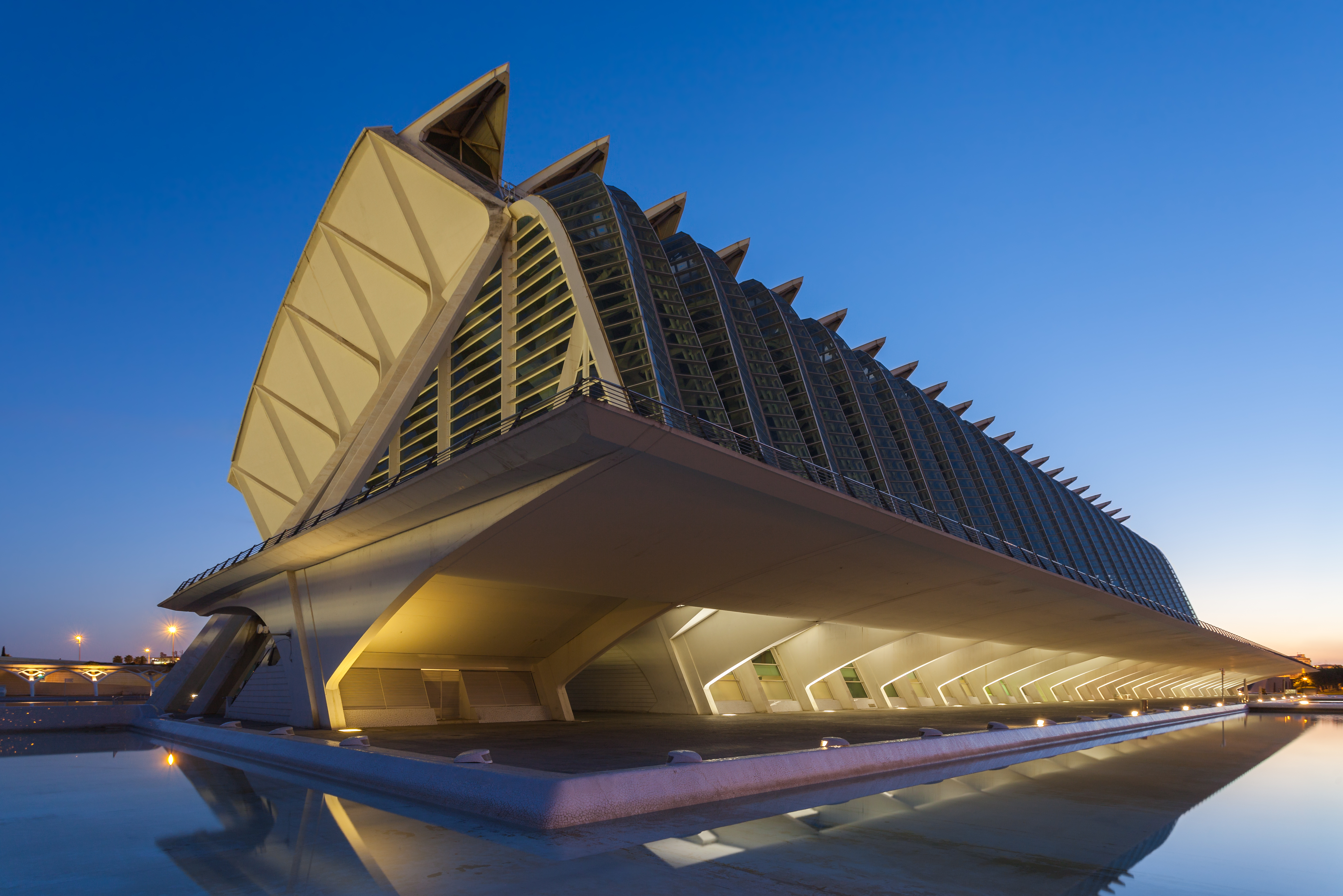
- External view of the museum from the southeast

- Location within Valencian Community
- Established: 13 November 2000; 25 years ago
- Location: City of Arts and Sciences, Valencia, Spain
- Coordinates: 39°27′21″N 0°21′05″W
- Type: Science museum
- Visitors: 891,645 (2019)
- Director: Manuel Toharia
- Curator: Generalitat Valenciana
- Public transit access: Alameda metro station (at distance)
- Website: Príncipe Felipe Science Museum

The Museu de les Ciències Príncipe Felipe (Valencian: Museu de les Ciències Príncep Felip, Spanish: Museo de las Ciencias Príncipe Felipe, anglicised as "Science Museum Príncipe Felipe") (Note: Pronunciation, Valencian: [muˈzɛw ðe les siˈɛnsies ˈpɾinsep feˈlip], Spanish: [muˈseo ðe las ˈθjenθjas ˈpɾinθipe feˈlipe].) is a science museum in Valencia, Spain. It is part of the City of Arts and Sciences, an architectural complex within the city, and can be found at the end of Luis García Berlanga Street. Its director is Manuel Toharia, a Spanish science writer and television personality.

The building is over 40,000 square metres (430,000 sq ft), has a height of 55 metres (180 ft), and it resembles the skeleton of a whale, a façade that was designed by Santiago Calatrava and was built by a joint venture of Fomento de Construcciones y Contratas and Necso. Its construction started around 1994, it was symbolically inaugurated in March 2000 by Felipe, Prince of Asturias (later King Felipe VI), and it opened on 13 November 2000 with an investment of 26 billion pesetas.

The purpose of the museum is to have interactive exhibitions and temporary collections related to science and technology without valuable items. Some scenes from the film Tomorrowland (2015) were filmed at the City of Arts and Sciences, including some shots on the museum's cantilever.

== Gallery ==
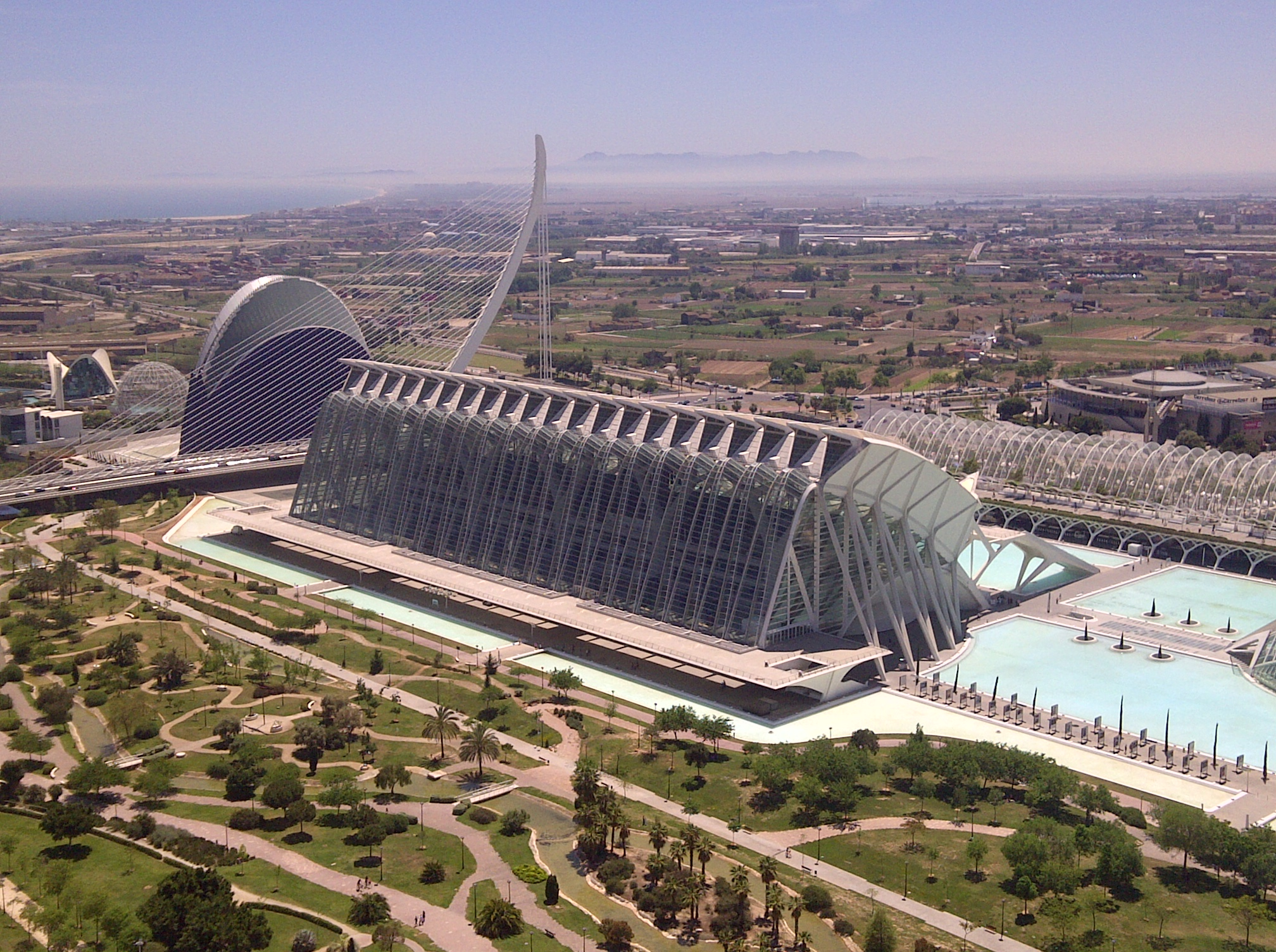
View of the museum from the southwest

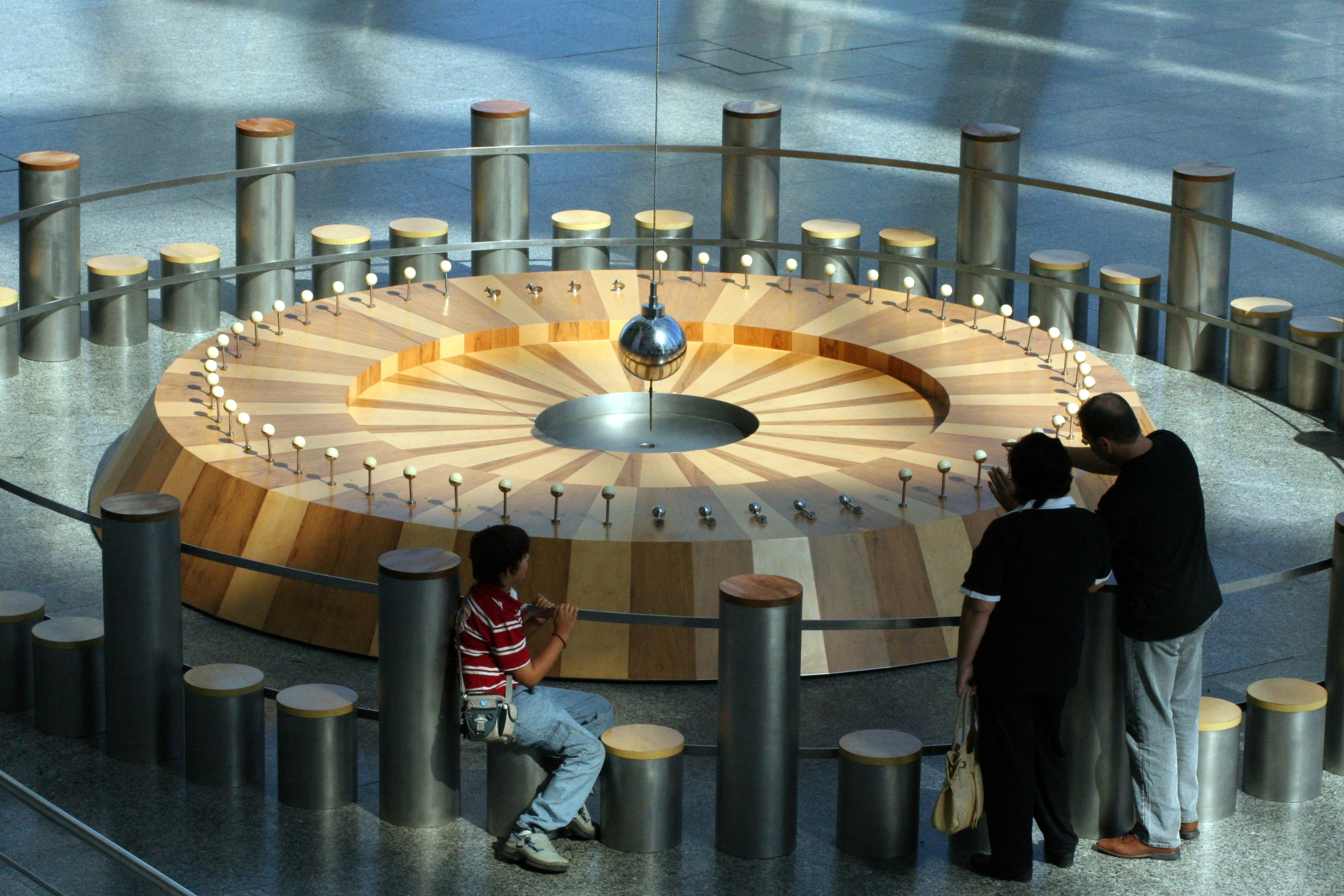
Foucault's pendulum in the museum

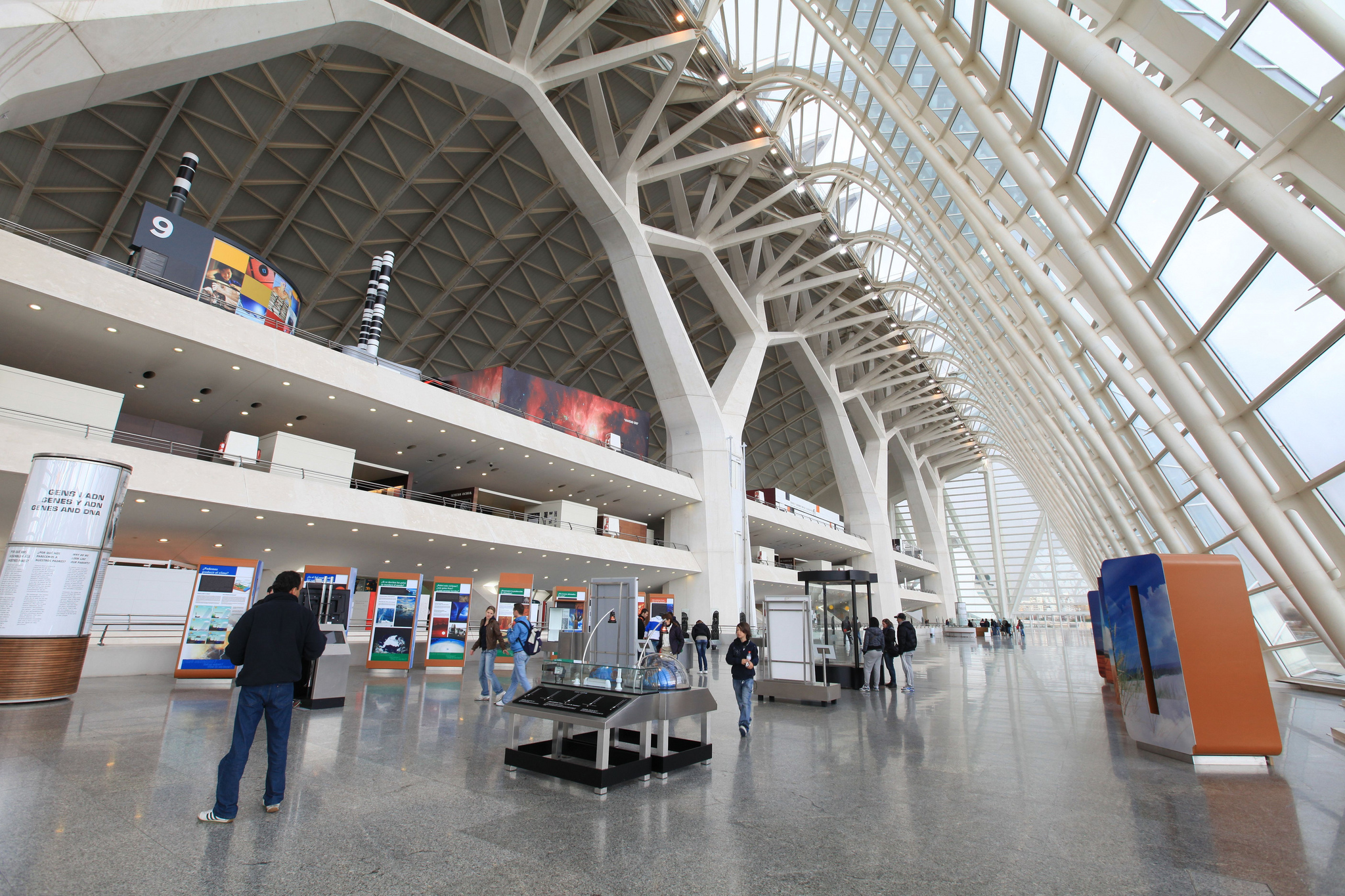
A climate change exhibition
