= Manuel Toharia =

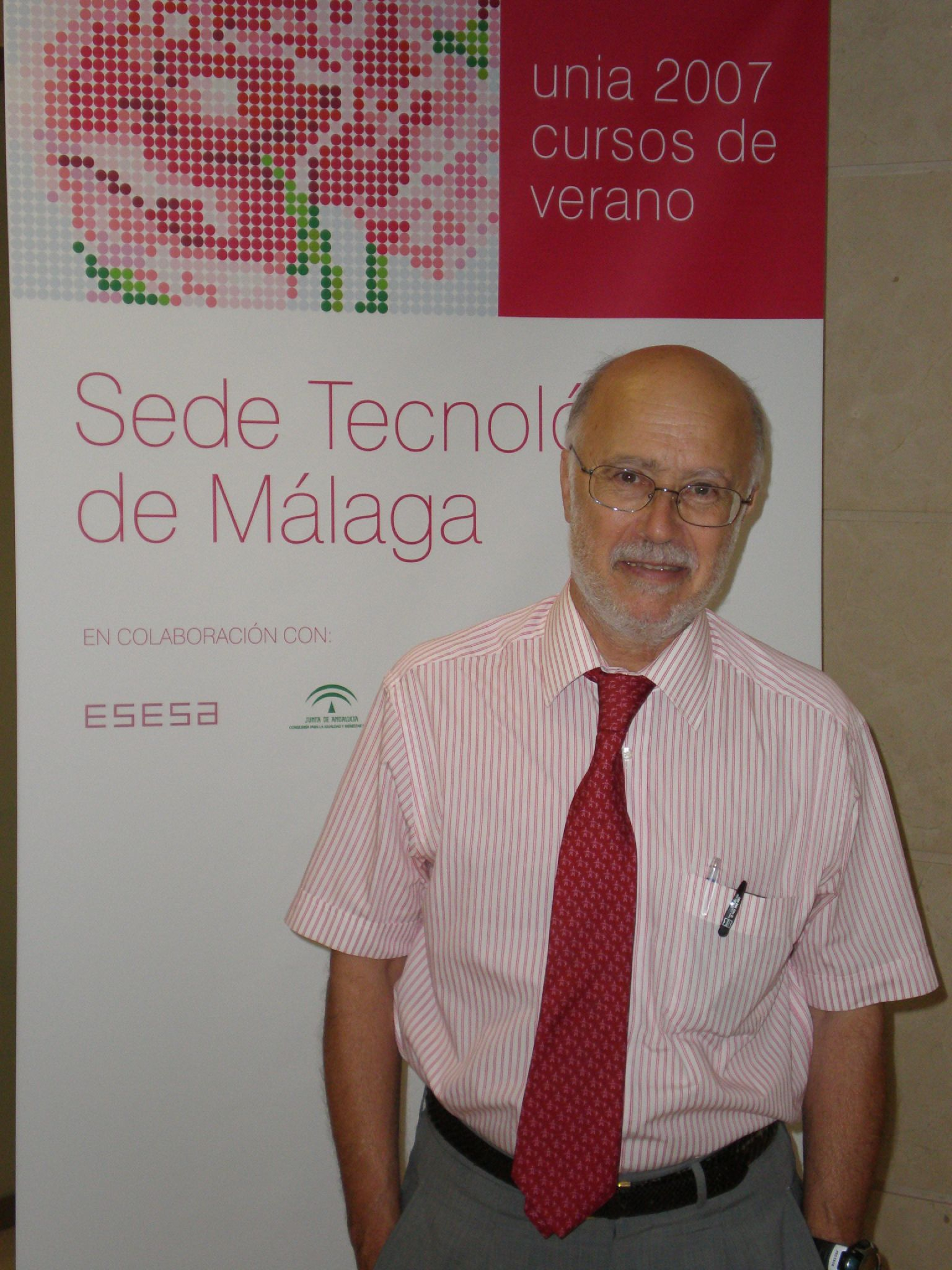
- Toharia at the 2007 Summer Courses of the Universidad Internacional de Andalucía
- Born: Manuel Toharia Cortés; August 3, 1944 (age 81); Madrid, Spain
- Occupations: Director, Television personality

Manuel Toharia Cortés is a Spanish science writer, museum director, and television personality.

== Early life and education ==
Born on August 3, 1944, in Madrid, Spain, Toharia is the Science Director of the City of Arts and Sciences, and the Príncipe Felipe Science Museum in Valencia, since taking the post in 1999.

Toharia holds a degree in physics from the Universidad Complutense de Madrid, which is specializing in astrophysics.

== Career ==
From 1970 to 1979, Toharia was the editor of the science section of the Spanish newspaper, Informaciones, and was one of the most popular figures in Spanish television as the "weather man" on Televisión Española (TVE), until the early 1980s.

In 1991, he wrote and published a children's book called, Momentos Estelares de la Ciencia (English version as "The Highlights of Science and its Greatest Scientists and Inventors"), which is illustrated by Willi Glasauer, and published by Círculo de Lectores. This children's book includes fun facts, trivia, and information accompanied by photos and Willi Glasauer's illustrations of the likes of Albert Einstein, the evolution of writing, Thomas Edison, Wilbur Wright and Orville Wright, Alexander Graham Bell, Charles Darwin, Archimedes, Isaac Newton, Henry Ford, Benjamin Franklin, the Neanderthals, Christopher Columbus, and Rube Goldberg.

Toharia directed and hosted various science programs on TVE, including Alcores (1981–1983), Última Frontera (1983–1984), Viva la Ciencia (1990), and El Alambique (1989) on Canal Sur.
