= Navares de Ayuso =

- Municipality
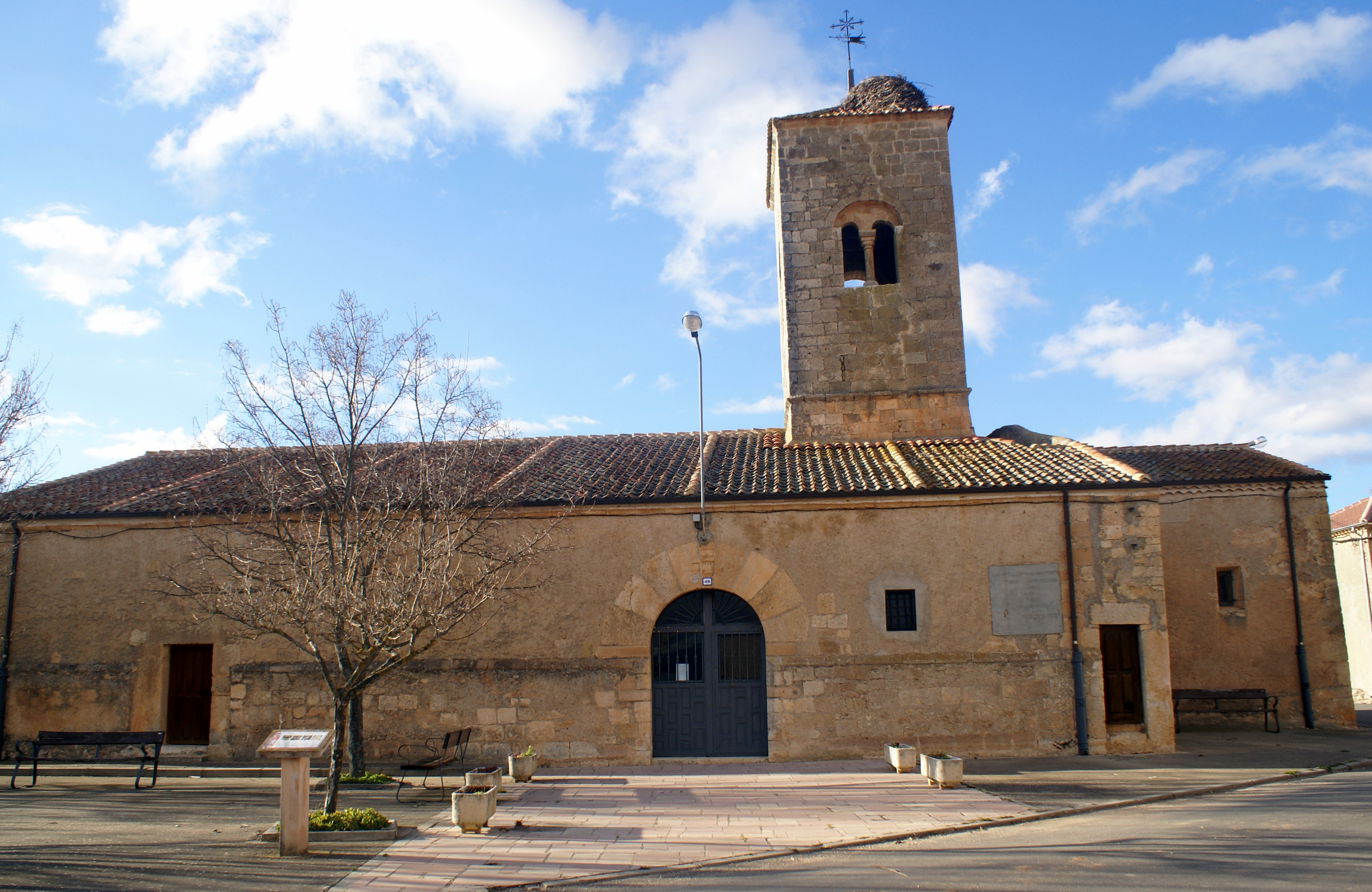
- Church of Navares de Ayuso

- Location in Spain. Navares de Ayuso (Spain)
- Coordinates: 41°22′22″N 3°42′23″W
- Country: Spain
- Autonomous community: Castile and León
- Province: Segovia
- Municipality: Navares de Ayuso

Area
  - Total: 14 km^{2} (5.4 sq mi)

Population (2025-01-01)
  - Total: 58
  - Density: 4.1/km^{2} (11/sq mi)
- Time zone: UTC+1 (CET)
  - Summer (DST): UTC+2 (CEST)
- Website: Official website

Navares de Ayuso is a municipality located in the province of Segovia, Castile and León, Spain. According to the 2004 census (INE), the municipality had a population of 73 inhabitants.
