= Joaquín Ayuso =

Spanish businessperson

Joaquín Ayuso García (born 1955 in Madrid, Spain). Chief Executive Officer of Grupo Ferrovial, one of the world's leading infrastructure groups in terms of earnings and market capitalisation with more than 100,000 employees.

== Career ==
He joined Ferrovial in 1982, starting as site engineer; he was subsequently promoted to Project Supervisor, Group Manager, Area Manager and Regional Manager. From 1999 to 2002, he was CEO of "Ferrovial Agromán", the Group's construction arm.

He was appointed member of the Board of Directors of Bankia on 25 May 2012 (reelected on 15 March 2013).

== Education ==
Ayuso graduated in Civil Engineering from the Universidad Politécnica de Madrid.
