= 2009 Credicard Citi MasterCard Tennis Cup – Doubles =

Doubles
- 2009 Credicard Citi MasterCard Tennis Cup

Final
- Champions: (United Kingdom) Joshua Goodall (Australia) Samuel Groth
- Runners-up: (Brazil) Rogério Dutra da Silva (Brazil) Júlio Silva
- Score: 7–6(4), 6–3

Events
| Singles | Doubles |
| ← 2008 · | Credicard Citi MasterCard Tennis Cup | · 2010 → |

Brian Dabul and Marcel Felder were the defending champions, but only Felder tried to defend his title.
He partnered with Juan-Pablo Amado, but they lost to Joshua Goodall and Samuel Groth in the semis.
Goodall and Groth won this tournament, by defeating Rogério Dutra da Silva and Júlio Silva 7–6(4), 6–3 in the final.

== Seeds ==
1. (Mexico) Santiago González / (Argentina) Horacio Zeballos (first round)
2. (Brazil) Rogério Dutra da Silva / (Brazil) Júlio Silva (final)
3. (Brazil) Ricardo Hocevar / (Brazil) Caio Zampieri (first round)
4. (Brazil) Márcio Torres / (South Africa) Izak van der Merwe (quarterfinals)

== Draw ==
=== Key ===
- Q = Qualifier
- WC = Wild card
- LL = Lucky loser
- Alt = Alternate
- SE = Special exempt
- PR = Protected ranking
- ITF = ITF entry
- JE = Junior exempt
- w/o = Walkover
- r = Retired
- d = Defaulted
- SR = Special ranking

=== Draw ===
First round
1 | (Mexico) S González (Argentina) H Zeballos | 3 | 6 | [7]
(United Kingdom) J Goodall (Australia) S Groth | 6 | 3 | [10]
(South Africa) R Klaasen (India) A Singh | 6 | 6^{7} | [10]
(Brazil) M Demoliner (Brazil) R Guidolin | 3 | 7 | [12]
4 | (Brazil) M Torres (South Africa) I van der Merwe | 6 | 6
(Brazil) Eric Gomes (Brazil) A Miele | 4 | 3
(Argentina) Juan-Pablo Amado (Uruguay) M Felder | 6 | 7
(Mexico) B Echagaray (Brazil) R Mello | 4 | 6^{5}
(Argentina) JI Chela (Argentina) M Hood | 6 | 6
WC | (Brazil) D Ferraz (Brazil) R Siggia | 1 | 0
WC | (Brazil) A Bonatto (Brazil) J Pereira | 7 | 6
3 | (Brazil) R Hocevar (Brazil) C Zampieri | 6^{4} | 3
(Brazil) L Kirche (Brazil) D Silva | 6 | 6
WC | (Brazil) R Rondino (Brazil) G Wanderley | 4 | 2
(Denmark) K Pless (United Kingdom) J Ward | 3 | 4
2 | (Brazil) R Dutra da Silva (Brazil) J Silva | 6 | 6

Quarterfinals
(United Kingdom) J Goodall (Australia) S Groth | 6 | 7
(Brazil) M Demoliner (Brazil) R Guidolin | 2 | 6^{4}
4 | (Brazil) M Torres (South Africa) I van der Merwe | 6 | 6^{5} | [11]
(Argentina) J-P Amado (Uruguay) M Felder | 3 | 7 | [13]
(Argentina) JI Chela (Argentina) M Hood | 6 | 6
WC | (Brazil) A Bonatto (Brazil) J Pereira | 3 | 3
(Brazil) L Kirche (Brazil) D Silva | 7 | 3 | [8]
2 | (Brazil) R Dutra da Silva (Brazil) J Silva | 5 | 6 | [10]

Semifinals
(United Kingdom) J Goodall (Australia) S Groth | 6 | 7
(Argentina) J-P Amado (Uruguay) M Felder | 4 | 5
(Argentina) JI Chela (Argentina) M Hood | 7 | 2 | [4]
2 | (Brazil) R Dutra da Silva (Brazil) J Silva | 6^{5} | 6 | [10]

Finals
(United Kingdom) J Goodall (Australia) S Groth | 7 | 6
2 | (Brazil) R Dutra da Silva (Brazil) J Silva | 6^{4} | 3
