= 2009 Credicard Citi MasterCard Tennis Cup – Singles =

Singles
- 2009 Credicard Citi MasterCard Tennis Cup

Final
- Champion: (Argentina) Horacio Zeballos
- Runner-up: (Brazil) Thiago Alves
- Score: 6–7(4), 6–4, 6–3

Events
Singles	Doubles
← 2008 ·	Credicard Citi MasterCard Tennis Cup	· 2010 →

Brian Dabul was the defending champion, but he chose to not participate this year.
Horacio Zeballos defeated Thiago Alves 6–7(4), 6–4, 6–3 in the final.

== Seeds ==
1. (Brazil) Thiago Alves (final)
2. (Argentina) Horacio Zeballos (champion)
3. (Argentina) Juan Ignacio Chela (semifinals)
4. (Mexico) Santiago González (second round)
5. (Brazil) Ricardo Hocevar (second round)
6. (Argentina) Eduardo Schwank (first round)
7. (United Kingdom) Joshua Goodall (second round)
8. (Brazil) João Souza (second round)

== Draw ==
=== Key ===
- Q = Qualifier
- WC = Wild card
- LL = Lucky loser
- Alt = Alternate
- SE = Special exempt
- PR = Protected ranking
- ITF = ITF entry
- JE = Junior exempt
- w/o = Walkover
- r = Retired
- d = Defaulted
- SR = Special ranking

=== Final four ===
Semifinals
1	(Brazil) Thiago Alves	6	6
(Brazil) Marcelo Demoliner	3	4
3/WC	(Argentina) Juan Ignacio Chela	4	6	2
2	(Argentina) Horacio Zeballos	6	3	6

Final
1	(Brazil) Thiago Alves	7	4	3
2	(Argentina) Horacio Zeballos	6^{4}	6	6

=== Top half ===
First round
1	(Brazil) T Alves	6	7
Q	(Brazil) A Miele	3	5
SE	(Spain) G Alcaide	3	2
(Brazil) J Silva	6	6
Q	(South Africa) R Klaasen	6	6
Q	(Brazil) A Bonatto	1	2
(South Africa) I van der Merwe	4	4
8	(Brazil) J Souza	6	6
4	(Mexico) S González	6	6
WC	(Brazil) J Pereira	4	4
(Argentina) J-P Amado	0	3
(Brazil) R Mello	6	6
(Brazil) M Demoliner	7	6
(Dominican Republic) V Estrella	6^{3}	2
(Brazil) L Kirche	6^{2}	3
5	(Brazil) R Hocevar	7	6

Second round
1	(Brazil) T Alves	5	7	6
(Brazil) J Silva	7	6^{4}	2
Q	(South Africa) R Klaasen	5	7	6
8	(Brazil) J Souza	7	6^{2}	2
4	(Mexico) S González	3	1
(Brazil) R Mello	6	6
(Brazil) M Demoliner	7	7
5	(Brazil) R Hocevar	6^{4}	6^{5}

Quarterfinals
1	(Brazil) T Alves	3	6	6
Q	(South Africa) R Klaasen	6	2	1
(Brazil) R Mello	4	3
(Brazil) M Demoliner	6	6

Semifinals
1	(Brazil) T Alves	6	6
(Brazil) M Demoliner	3	4

=== Bottom half ===
First round
6	(Argentina) E Schwank	2	2
(Brazil) C Zampieri	6	6
(Brazil) R Dutra da Silva	6	6
Q	(Argentina) G Pella	2	3
(United Kingdom) J Ward	6	3	6
(Mexico) B Echagaray	3	6	3
(Australia) S Groth	6	4	6^{2}
3/WC	(Argentina) JI Chela	2	6	7
7	(United Kingdom) J Goodall	6	6
WC	(Brazil) R Siggia	2	3
(France) D Guez	6	6
WC	(Brazil) R Rondino	1	3
(Uruguay) M Felder	7	6
(Brazil) D Silva	6^{4}	3
(Denmark) K Pless	6	r
2	(Argentina) H Zeballos	6

Second round
(Brazil) C Zampieri	7	6
(Brazil) R Dutra da Silva	6^{4}	3
(United Kingdom) J Ward	2	3
3/WC	(Argentina) JI Chela	6	6
7	(United Kingdom) J Goodall	6^{4}	2
(France) D Guez	7	6
(Uruguay) M Felder	2	4
2	(Argentina) H Zeballos	6	6

Quarterfinals
(Brazil) C Zampieri	2	2
3/WC	(Argentina) JI Chela	6	6
(France) D Guez	3	d
2	(Argentina) H Zeballos	4

Semifinals
3/WC	(Argentina) JI Chela	4	6	2
2	(Argentina) H Zeballos	6	3	6
