= 2010 MasterCard Tennis Cup – Doubles =

Doubles
- 2010 MasterCard Tennis Cup

Final
- Champions: (Brazil) Rogério Dutra da Silva (Brazil) Júlio Silva
- Runners-up: (Brazil) Vítor Manzini (Brazil) Pedro Zerbinni
- Score: 7–6(3), 6–2

Events
Singles	Doubles
← 2009 ·	MasterCard Tennis Cup	· 2011 →

Brian Dabul and Marcel Felder were the defending champions. Dabul didn't compete this year and Felder played with Andrés Molteni, losing in the quarterfinals.
Rogério Dutra da Silva and Júlio Silva won the title, defeating Vítor Manzini and Pedro Zerbinni 7–6(3), 6–2 in the final.

== Seeds ==
1. (South Africa) Raven Klaasen / (South Africa) Izak van der Merwe (first round)
2. (Brazil) Ricardo Hocevar / (Brazil) João Souza (semifinals)
3. (Brazil) Marcelo Demoliner / (Brazil) Rodrigo Guidolin (first round)
4. (Brazil) Rogério Dutra da Silva / (Brazil) Júlio Silva (champions)

== Draw ==
=== Key ===
- Q = Qualifier
- WC = Wild card
- LL = Lucky loser
- Alt = Alternate
- SE = Special exempt
- PR = Protected ranking
- ITF = ITF entry
- JE = Junior exempt
- w/o = Walkover
- r = Retired
- d = Defaulted
- SR = Special ranking

=== Draw ===
First round
1	(South Africa) R Klaasen (South Africa) I van der Merwe	6^{5}	6	[6]
WC	(Brazil) V Manzini (Brazil) P Zerbinni	7	4	[10]
(United States) B Evans (Japan) T Ito	6	4	[11]
(United Kingdom) J Baker (United States) N Monroe	1	6	[9]
3	(Brazil) M Demoliner (Brazil) R Guidolin	7	5	[4]
(Colombia) JS Cabal (Colombia) R Farah	5	7	[10]
(Italy) R Ghedin (Brazil) M Torres	6	4	[7]
(Uruguay) M Felder (Argentina) A Molteni	2	6	[10]
(France) D Guez (France) J Ouanna	6^{6}	3
(Brazil) R Mello (Brazil) C Zampieri	7	6
WC	(Brazil) F Romboli (Brazil) D Silva	4	4
4	(Brazil) R Dutra da Silva (Brazil) J Silva	6	6
(Argentina) F Bagnis (Argentina) G Pella	3	4
(France) C-A Brezac (France) V Stouff	6	6
WC	(Brazil) G Clezar (Brazil) T Pinheiro	3	3
2	(Brazil) R Hocevar (Brazil) J Souza	6	6

Quarterfinals
WC	(Brazil) V Manzini (Brazil) P Zerbinni	7	6
(United States) B Evans (Japan) T Ito	5	3
(Colombia) JS Cabal (Colombia) R Farah	6	6
(Uruguay) M Felder (Argentina) A Molteni	1	4
(Brazil) R Mello (Brazil) C Zampieri	7	4	[8]
4	(Brazil) R Dutra da Silva (Brazil) J Silva	6^{4}	6	[10]
(France) C-A Brezac (France) V Stouff	6	6^{4}	[8]
2	(Brazil) R Hocevar (Brazil) J Souza	4	7	[10]

Semifinals
WC	(Brazil) V Manzini (Brazil) P Zerbinni
(Colombia) JS Cabal (Colombia) R Farah	w/o
4	(Brazil) R Dutra da Silva (Brazil) J Silva	6	6
2	(Brazil) R Hocevar (Brazil) J Souza	3	4

Finals
WC	(Brazil) V Manzini (Brazil) P Zerbinni	6^{3}	2
4	(Brazil) R Dutra da Silva (Brazil) J Silva	7	6
