= Sapucaí River (Minas Gerais) =

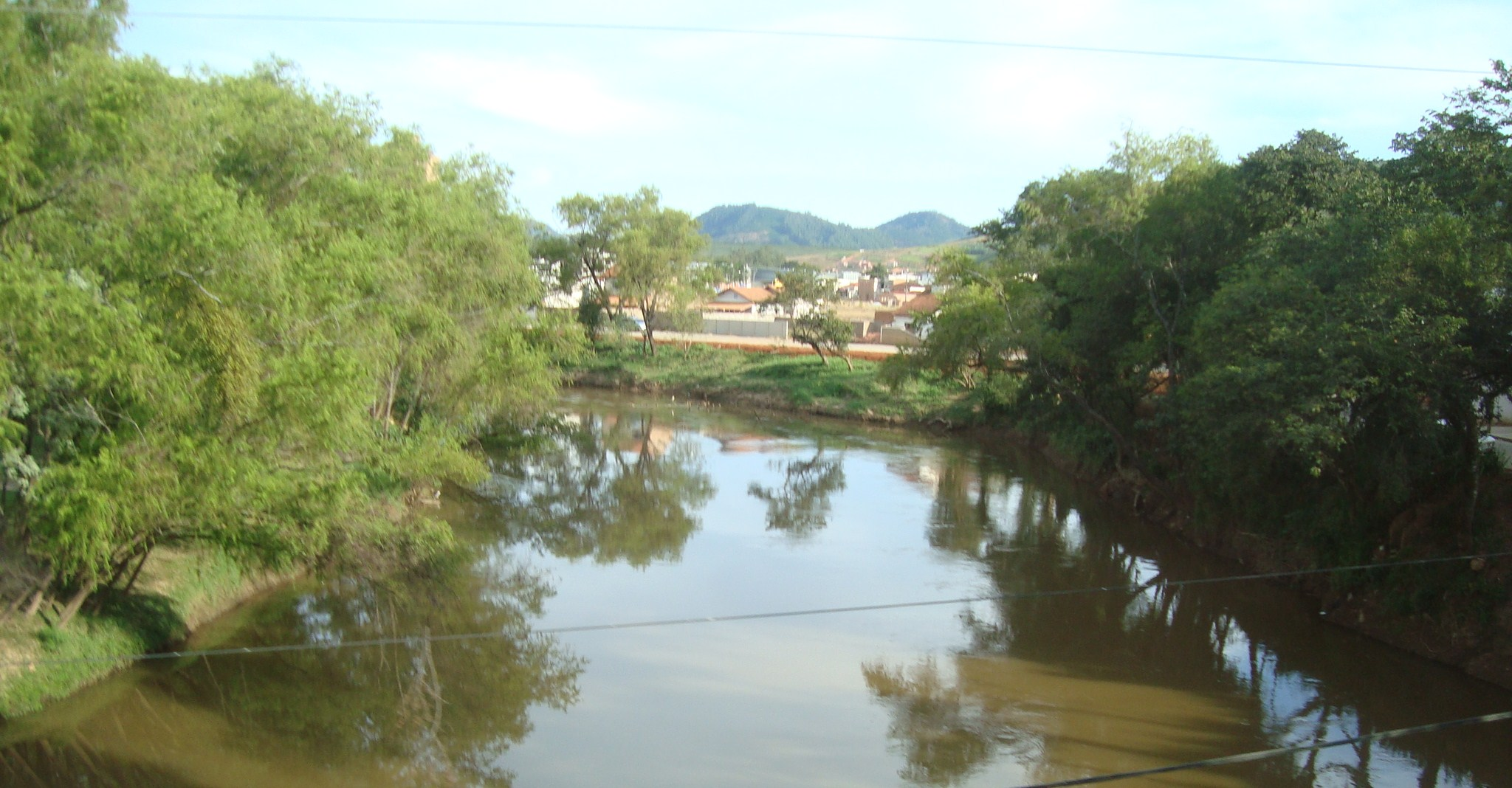
- Sapucaí River in Santa Rita do Sapucaí

- Location within Brazil
- Native name: Rio Sapucaí (Portuguese)

Location
- Country: Brazil

Physical characteristics
- Source
  - location: Campos do Jordão, São Paulo
  - coordinates: 22.743886°S 45.611572°W
- Mouth
  - location: Rio Grande, Minas Gerais
  - coordinates: 20.723°S 46.134°W

The Sapucaí River (Portuguese: Rio Sapucaí) is a river of the states of São Paulo and Minas Gerais in southeastern Brazil. It is a tributary of the Rio Grande.

== Course ==
The headwaters of the river are protected by the 39,800 hectares (98,000 acres) Sapucaí Mirim Environmental Protection Area, created in 1998. The 180,373 hectares (445,710 acres) Fernão Dias Environmental Protection Area, created in 1997, also protects some of the headwaters. In its upper reaches in São Paulo state, the Sapucaí River flows through the 8,341 hectares (20,610 acres) Campos do Jordão State Park, created in 1941. To the north of the park, for a short section, the Sapucaí forms the border between São Paulo and Minas Gerais, before flowing north into Minas Gerais. It flows through the town of Itajubá, then continues north and is joined from the left by the Sapucaí-Mirim River to the east of Pouso Alegre. Further north it is joined by the Rio Verde from the right at 21.459118°S 45.665075°W, where the combined rivers form one of the arms of the reservoir created by the Furnas Dam.

== See also ==
- List of rivers of Minas Gerais
