= 2010 MasterCard Tennis Cup – Singles =

Singles
- 2010 MasterCard Tennis Cup

Final
- Champion: (South Africa) Izak van der Merwe
- Runner-up: (Brazil) Ricardo Mello
- Score: 7–6(6), 6–3

Events
Singles	Doubles
- MasterCard Tennis Cup

Horacio Zeballos won last year's edition, but decided not to participate this year.
Izak van der Merwe won the singles title, defeating Ricardo Mello 7–6(6), 6–3 in the finals.

== Seeds ==
1. (Brazil) Ricardo Mello (final)
2. (France) David Guez (first round)
3. (Brazil) Marcos Daniel (first round)
4. (France) Josselin Ouanna (first round)
5. (Brazil) João Souza (second round)
6. (Brazil) Júlio Silva (first round)
7. (Brazil) Caio Zampieri (quarterfinals)
8. (France) Charles-Antoine Brézac (first round)

== Draw ==
Key

- Q = Qualifier
- WC = Wild card
- LL = Lucky loser
- Alt = Alternate
- ITF = ITF entry
- PR = Protected ranking
- SR = Special ranking
- SE = Special exempt
- JE = Junior exempt
- JR = Junior Accelerator Programme entrant
- CO = College Accelerator Programme entrant
- NG = Next Gen Accelerator Program entrant
- w/o = Walkover
- r = Retired
- d = Defaulted

=== Finals ===
Semifinals
1	(Brazil) Ricardo Mello	7	6
(Ecuador) Giovanni Lapentti	5	3
(South Africa) Izak van der Merwe	5	6	6
ALT	(Colombia) Robert Farah	7	3	4

Final
1	(Brazil) Ricardo Mello	6^{6}	3
(South Africa) Izak van der Merwe	7	6

=== Top half ===
First round
1	(Brazil) R Mello	6	7
WC	(Brazil) Guilherme Clezar	4	6^{5}
WC	(Brazil) J Pereira	6	7
Q	(Brazil) F Romboli	2	5
(Argentina) A Molteni	7	6
(Argentina) Juan-Pablo Amado	5	3
(Colombia) J S Cabal	7	6
8	(France) Charles-Antoine Brézac	6^{9}	0
4	(France) J Ouanna	6	6^{5}	6^{5}
(United Kingdom) J Baker	4	7	7
(Brazil) Alexandre Bonatto	4	6^{5}
(Ecuador) G Lapentti	6	7
Q	(Colombia) E Struvay	3	2
(Brazil) R Hocevar	6	6
(South Africa) R Klaasen	5	6^{7}
5	(Brazil) J Souza	7	7

Second round
1	(Brazil) R Mello	6	6
WC	(Brazil) J Pereira	1	2
(Argentina) A Molteni	4	3
(Colombia) J S Cabal	6	6
(United Kingdom) J Baker	4	6^{4}
(Ecuador) G Lapentti	6	7
(Brazil) R Hocevar	6	6
5	(Brazil) J Souza	2	4

Quarterfinals
1	(Brazil) R Mello	6	6
(Colombia) JS Cabal	4	3
(Ecuador) G Lapentti	7	7
(Brazil) R Hocevar	5	5

Semifinals
1	(Brazil) R Mello	7	6
(Ecuador) G Lapentti	5	3

=== Bottom half ===
First round
7	(Brazil) C Zampieri	4	6	7
(United States) B Evans	6	2	5
WC	(Brazil) Thiago Pinheiro	4	1
(Uruguay) M Felder	6	6
WC	(Brazil) M Demoliner	4	6	2
(Japan) T Ito	6	2	6
(South Africa) I van der Merwe	6	7
3	(Brazil) M Daniel	4	5
6	(Brazil) J Silva	6	6^{7}	1
Q	(Brazil) R Dutra da Silva	3	7	6
(Argentina) F Bagnis	6	4	4
ALT	(Colombia) R Farah	4	6	6
(Italy) R Ghedin	6	5	6
(Argentina) Guido Pella	3	7	4
Q	(Japan) T Matsui	6	6
2	(France) D Guez	4	2

Second round
7	(Brazil) C Zampieri	6	6	6
(Uruguay) M Felder	7	4	1
(Japan) T Ito	3	7	0
(South Africa) I van der Merwe	6	6^{2}	6
Q	(Brazil) R Dutra da Silva	4	2
ALT	(Colombia) R Farah	6	6
(Italy) R Ghedin	1	6	6
Q	(Japan) T Matsui	6	4	3

Quarterfinals
7	(Brazil) C Zampieri	0	4
(South Africa) I van der Merwe	6	6
ALT	(Colombia) R Farah	7	6
(Italy) R Ghedin	6^{5}	1

Semifinals
(South Africa) I van der Merwe	5	6	6
ALT	(Colombia) R Farah	7	3	4
