= Campos do Jordão State Park =

State park in São Paulo, Brazil

- Parque Estadual de Campos do Jordão
- IUCN category II (national park)
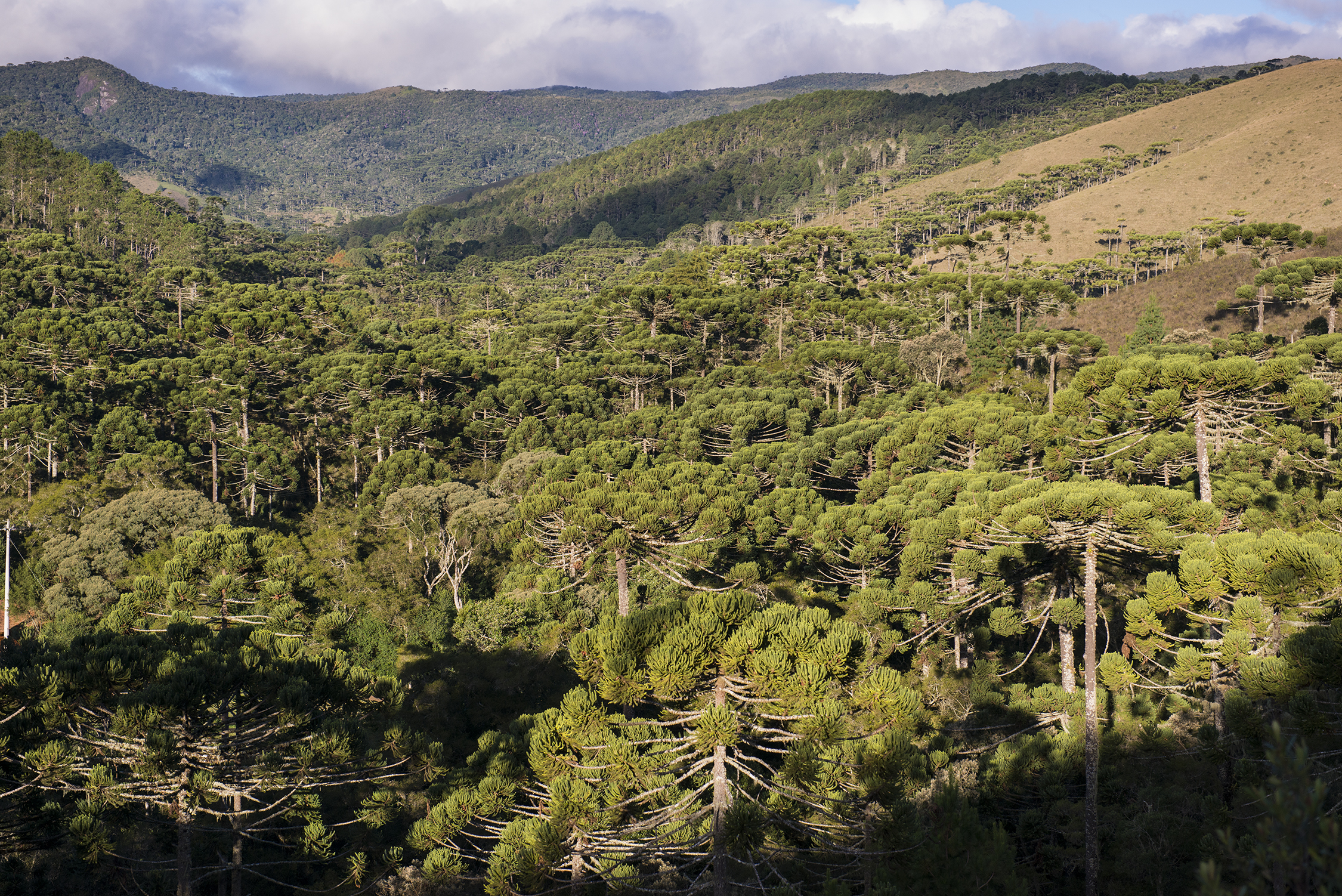
- Araucarias in the park

- Location within Brazil
- Nearest city: Campos do Jordão, São Paulo
- Coordinates: 22.702114°S 45.526761°W
- Area: 8,341 hectares (20,610 acres)
- Designation: State park
- Created: 27 March 1941
- Administrator: Fundação Florestal SP

The Campos do Jordão State Park (Portuguese: Parque Estadual de Campos do Jordão) is a state park in the state of São Paulo, Brazil.

== Location ==
The Campos do Jordão State Park, known locally as the Horto Florestal, covers an area of 8,341 hectares (20,610 acres). It occupies one third of the municipality of Campos do Jordão, São Paulo, on the border with Minas Gerais. The park contains an important remnant of Atlantic Forest, including Araucária and Podocarpus forest, alpine meadows and cloud forest. It contains the largest contiguous tract of pines in southeast Brazil in its deep valleys and hills with altitudes that vary from 1,030 to 2,007 metres (3,379 to 6,585 ft). There is diverse fauna with more than 186 known species of birds and endangered animals such as cougar (Puma concolor), ocelot (Leopardus pardalis) and the vinaceous-breasted amazon (Amazona vinacea).

The park has a visitor center, barbecues, fitness area, nurseries, showers, chapel, restaurant, craft shop and trails for walking and cycling. A 12 metres (39 ft) wooden tower gives a panoramic view. The Sapucaí River and Four Bridges trails follow the Sapucaí River. Other more or less challenging trails lead to the Gargalhada and Celestina waterfalls.

== History ==
The Campos do Jordão State Park was created on 27 March 1941. When the state park was created a policy of encouraging reforestation with exotic species was followed, with conifers introduced in large areas. 2,000 hectares (4,900 acres) were degraded by planting pines, mostly pinus elliottii and pinus taeda. These should be removed through sustainable forest management to allow the natural local vegetation to regenerate.

Management of the park is integrated with the 503 hectares (1,240 acres) Mananciais de Campos do Jordão State Park, created in 1993 to protect the water supply of the municipal seat. The park is part of the Mantiqueira Environmental Protection Area. It is also part of the 445,615-hectare (1,101,140-acre) Mantiqueira Mosaic, created in 2006.

== Sources ==
- Horto Florestal (in Portuguese), Horto Florestal de Campos do Jordao
- o mosaico mantiqueira (in Portuguese), Mosaico Mantiqueira, archived from the original on 2016-09-27
- Parque Estadual Mananciais de Campos do Jordão (in Portuguese), SAP: Sistema Ambiental Paulista, archived from the original on 2017-05-04
- Sobre o Parque (in Portuguese), SAP: Sistema Ambiental Paulista, archived from the original on 2016-10-01
