= Mananciais de Campos do Jordão State Park =

State park in São Paulo, Brazil

- Parque Estadual dos Mananciais de Campos do Jordão
- IUCN category II (national park)
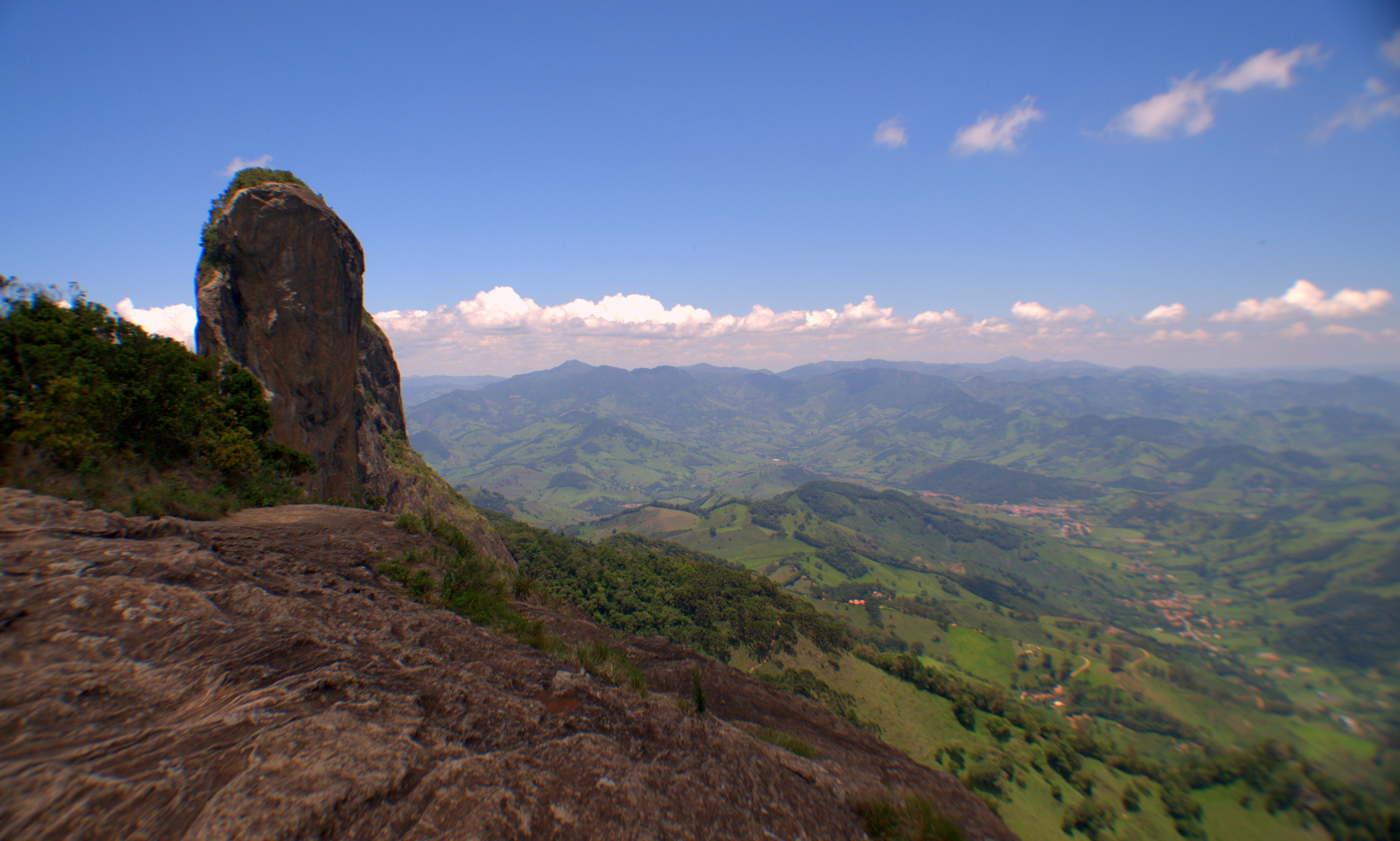
- Da Pedra do Baú

- Location within Brazil
- Nearest city: Campos do Jordão, São Paulo
- Coordinates: 22°46′02″S 45°33′48″W
- Area: 502.96 hectares (1,242.8 acres)
- Designation: State park
- Created: 27 September 1993

The Mananciais de Campos do Jordão State Park (Portuguese: Parque Estadual Mananciais de Campos do Jordão) is a state park in the state of São Paulo, Brazil.

== Location ==
The Mananciais de Campos do Jordão State Park (Note: "Mananciais de Campos do Jordão" may be translated as "Jordan Fields Watershed".) is in the municipality of Campos do Jordão, São Paulo, near the municipal seat. It has an area of 502.96 hectares (1,242.8 acres). It is in the Paraíba Valley metropolitan region, which is known for its green landscape, cool mountain climate and European architecture. The region is a tourist destination, particularly in the winter. The park contains large numbers of exotic pine trees and remnants of secondary forest around the Salto dam. Altitudes vary from 1,640 to 1,886 metres (5,381 to 6,188 ft).

== History ==
The Mananciais de Campos do Jordão State Park was created by state decree 37.539 of 27 September 1993. The main purpose of the park is to protect the water sources of the Salto Dam, which provides up to 30% of the water used by Campos do Jordão. The park protects the headwaters of the Córrego do Coutinho and Ribeirão das Perdizes streams, which form the Sapucaí Guaçu River, a tributary of the Rio Grande. The Salto Dam was built in 1940 where the two streams meet, and accounts for 60% of the water used by the city.

The park's management is integrated with the Campos do Jordão State Park. The management plan was due to be finalized by December 2013. The park is part of the Mantiqueira Mosaic of conservation units, established in 2006.

== Sources ==
- o mosaico mantiqueira (in Portuguese), Mosaico Mantiqueira, archived from the original on 2016-09-27
- Parque Estadual Mananciais de Campos do Jordão (in Portuguese), SAP: Sistema Ambiental Paulista, archived from the original on 2017-05-04
- "Parque Estadual Mananciais de Campos do Jordão", Via Rural (in Portuguese), archived from the original on June 15, 2009
