= 2009 Credicard Citi MasterCard Tennis Cup =

- Date: August 3 – August 9
- Edition: 9th
- Location: Campos do Jordão, Brazil

Champions

Singles
- (Argentina) Horacio Zeballos

Doubles
- (Argentina) Brian Dabul / (Uruguay) Marcel Felder
| ← 2008 · | Credicard Citi MasterCard Tennis Cup | · 2010 → |

The 2009 Credicard Citi MasterCard Tennis Cup was a professional tennis tournament played on outdoor red clay courts. It was the ninth edition of the tournament which was part of the 2009 ATP Challenger Tour. It took place in Campos do Jordão, Brazil between 3 and 9 August 2009.

== Singles entrants ==
=== Seeds ===
| Nationality | Player | Ranking* | Seeding |
|---|---|---|---|
| BRA | Thiago Alves | 88 | 1 |
| ARG | Horacio Zeballos | 98 | 2 |
| ARG | Juan Ignacio Chela | 165 | 3 |
| MEX | Santiago González | 173 | 4 |
| BRA | Ricardo Hocevar | 179 | 5 |
| ARG | Eduardo Schwank | 187 | 6 |
| GBR | Joshua Goodall | 193 | 7 |
| BRA | João Souza | 200 | 8 |

- Rankings are as of July 27, 2009.

=== Other entrants ===
The following players received wildcards into the singles main draw:

- (Brazil) José Pereira
- (Brazil) Rafael Rondino
- (Brazil) Ricardo Siggia

The following players received a Special Exempt into the main draw:

- (Spain) Guillermo Alcaide

The following players received entry from the qualifying draw:

- (Brazil) Alexandre Bonatto
- (South Africa) Raven Klaasen
- (Brazil) André Miele
- (Argentina) Guido Pella

== Champions ==
=== Singles ===
(Argentina) Horacio Zeballos def. (Brazil) Thiago Alves, 6–7(4), 6–4, 6–3

=== Doubles ===
(United Kingdom) Joshua Goodall / (Australia) Samuel Groth def. (Brazil) Rogério Dutra da Silva / (Brazil) Júlio Silva, 7–6(4), 6–3
