= 2010 MasterCard Tennis Cup =

- Date: August 2 – August 8
- Edition: 10th
- Location: Campos do Jordão, Brazil

Champions

Singles
- (South Africa) Izak van der Merwe

Doubles
- (Brazil) Rogério Dutra da Silva / (Brazil) Júlio Silva
← 2009 ·	MasterCard Tennis Cup	· 2011 →

The 2010 MasterCard Tennis Cup was a professional tennis tournament played on outdoor red clay courts. It was the tenth edition of the tournament which was part of the 2010 ATP Challenger Tour. It took place in Campos do Jordão, Brazil between 2 and 8 August 2010.

== Singles main draw entrants ==
=== Seeds ===
Nationality	Player	Ranking*	Seeding
BRA	Ricardo Mello	89	1
FRA	David Guez	125	2
BRA	Marcos Daniel	126	3
FRA	Josselin Ouanna	133	4
BRA	João Souza	139	5
BRA	Júlio Silva	172	6
BRA	Caio Zampieri	188	7
FRA	Charles-Antoine Brézac	239	8

- Rankings are as of July 26, 2010.

=== Other entrants ===
The following players received wildcards into the singles main draw:

- (Brazil) Guilherme Clézar
- (Brazil) Marcelo Demoliner
- (Brazil) José Pereira
- (Brazil) Thiago Pinheiro

The following players received entry from the qualifying draw:

- (Brazil) Rogério Dutra da Silva
- (Japan) Toshihide Matsui
- (Brazil) Fernando Romboli
- (Colombia) Eduardo Struvay

== Champions ==
=== Singles ===
(South Africa) Izak van der Merwe def. (Brazil) Ricardo Mello, 7–6(6), 6–3

=== Doubles ===
(Brazil) Rogério Dutra da Silva / (Brazil) Júlio Silva def. (Brazil) Vítor Manzini / (Brazil) Pedro Zerbinni, 7–6(3), 6–2
