= Campos do Jordão =

Municipality in the state of São Paulo, Brazil

- Municipality
- Municipality of Campos do Jordão
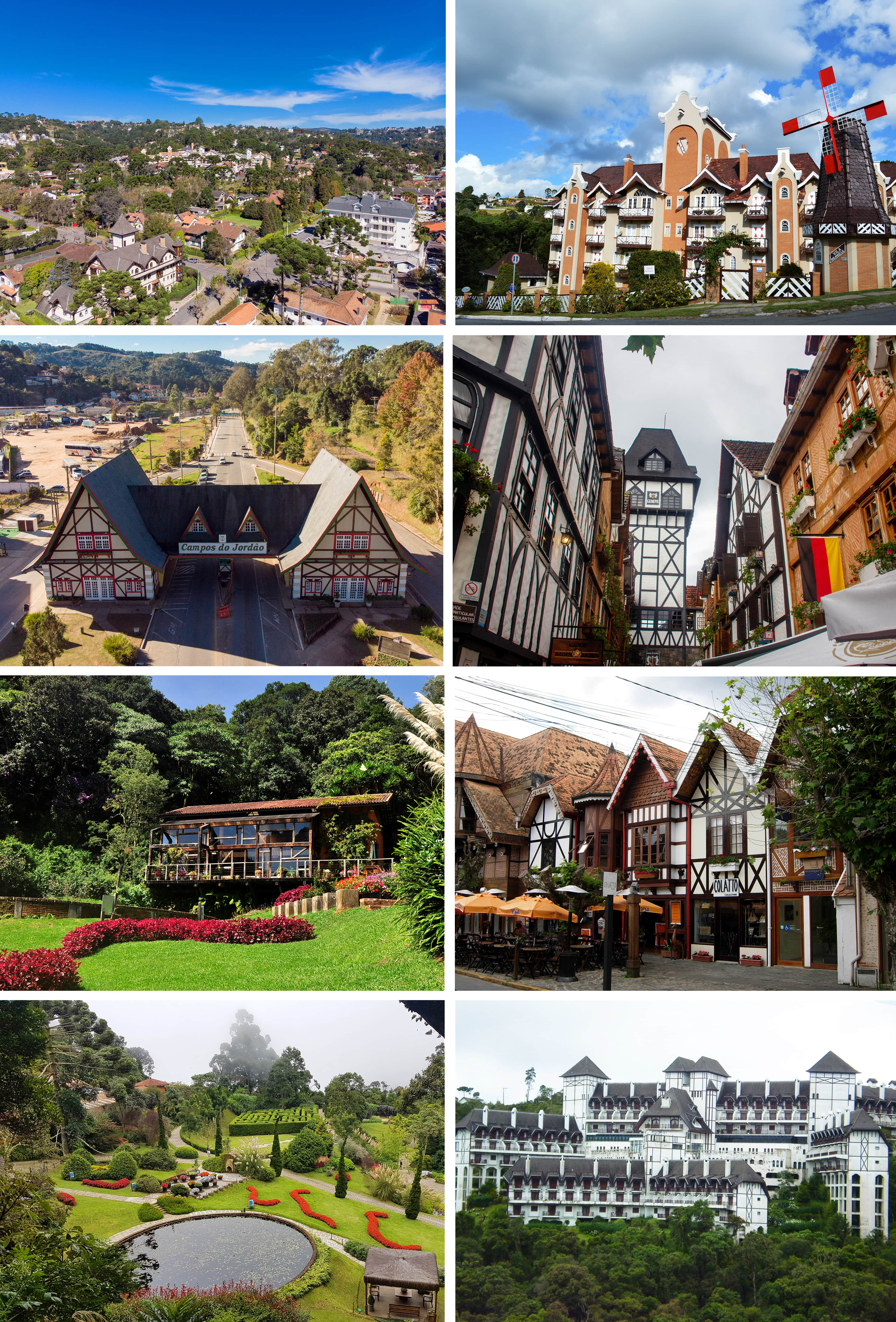
- Top left to bottom right: Aerial view of Capivari neighborhood; Vila Holandesa; Campos do Jodão city gate; Boulevard Geneve; Amantikir School; Djalma Forjaz Street; Amantikir Gardens; Home Green Home Hotel.

- Flag Coat of arms
- Nickname: Brazilian Switzerland
- Location of Campos do Jordão in the state of São Paulo

- Location of Campos do Jordão in Brazil
- Coordinates: 22°44′20″S 45°35′27″W
- Country: Brazil
- Region: Southeast
- State: São Paulo
- Metropolitan Region: Vale do Paraíba e Litoral Norte
- Founded: April 29, 1874

Government
  - Mayor: Carlos Eduardo Pereira da Silva Republicanos

Area
  - Total: 290.520 km^{2} (112.170 sq mi)
- Elevation: 1,628 m (5,341 ft)

Population (2020)
  - Total: 52,405
  - Density: 164.76/km^{2} (426.7/sq mi)
- Time zone: UTC-3 (BRT)
- Postal Code: 12460-000
- Area code: +55 12
- HDI (2010): 0.749 – high
- Website: www.camposdojordao.sp.gov.br

Campos do Jordão (Portuguese pronunciation: [ˈkɐ̃puz du ʒoʁˈdɐ̃w]) is a municipality in the state of São Paulo in southeastern Brazil. It is part of the Metropolitan Region of Vale do Paraíba e Litoral Norte. The population is 52,405 (2020 est.) in an area of 290.52 square kilometres (112.17 mi^{2}). The city is situated 1,628 metres (5,341 ft) above sea level and is the highest city in Brazil.

There are numerous outdoor activities for tourists and winter residents. These include hiking, mountain climbing, treetop cable swings (arborismo), horseback riding, and ATV and motorbike riding. July, of winter season vacations, sees an enormous influx of visitors (more than quadrupling the city's population), due in part to the winter festival of classical music.

Its attractions throughout the year include German, Swiss and Italian cuisine restaurants, bars, and a cable car. There are many pousadas (inns) and chalets. Also, in order to cater to the large number of visitors, several bars, lounges, discos and clubs open during the winter months.

== Demography ==
- Total Population: 51,454
- Population Density (inhabitants/km^{2}): 152.86
- Infant Mortality (0 to one year old) (per one thousand): 8.52
- Life Expectancy (years): 75.73
- Total Fertility Rate (Children per Woman): 2.18
- Literacy Rate: 92.28%
- Human Development Index (IHDI): 0.820
  - IHDI-M Income: 0.763
  - IHDI-M Life Expectancy: 0.846
  - IHDI-M Education: 0.851

Race	Percentage
White	83.9%
Multiracial	12.2%
Black	2.3%
Asian	0.5%

(Source: IPEADATA)

== Economy ==
The city's economy is based mainly on tourism; due to its location at high elevation in the Mantiqueira Mountains, and traditional European-style architecture. Buildings are mostly vernacular architecture from German, Swiss, or Italian models. Many of the wealthiest residents in the state of São Paulo have winter country houses here.

Despite the high income of many visitors, the HDI (0.820 in 2004) of Campos do Jordão is not very high because the owners of the houses in the best neighbourhoods are not regular inhabitants; these houses are used only during the holidays. The city can be reached from São Paulo mainly by road through the Rodovia Floriano Rodrigues Pinheiro. There is also a picturesque railroad from Pindamonhangaba, used mostly by tourists. At the end of the main road going through Campos do Jordão, there is a state park called Horto Florestal.

== Geography ==
The city is located in the northeastern side of the State of São Paulo, bordering Minas Gerais in the north. Campos do Jordão is at a distance of 180 km (112 miles) from the City of São Paulo, 334 km (208 miles) from the City of Rio de Janeiro, and 486 km (302 miles) from Belo Horizonte. The Mantiqueira Mountains provide unique panoramic views, and the municipality's region still has undeveloped old growth Atlantic Forest habitat. The native Brazilian Paraná pine (Araucaria angustifolia) is found here.

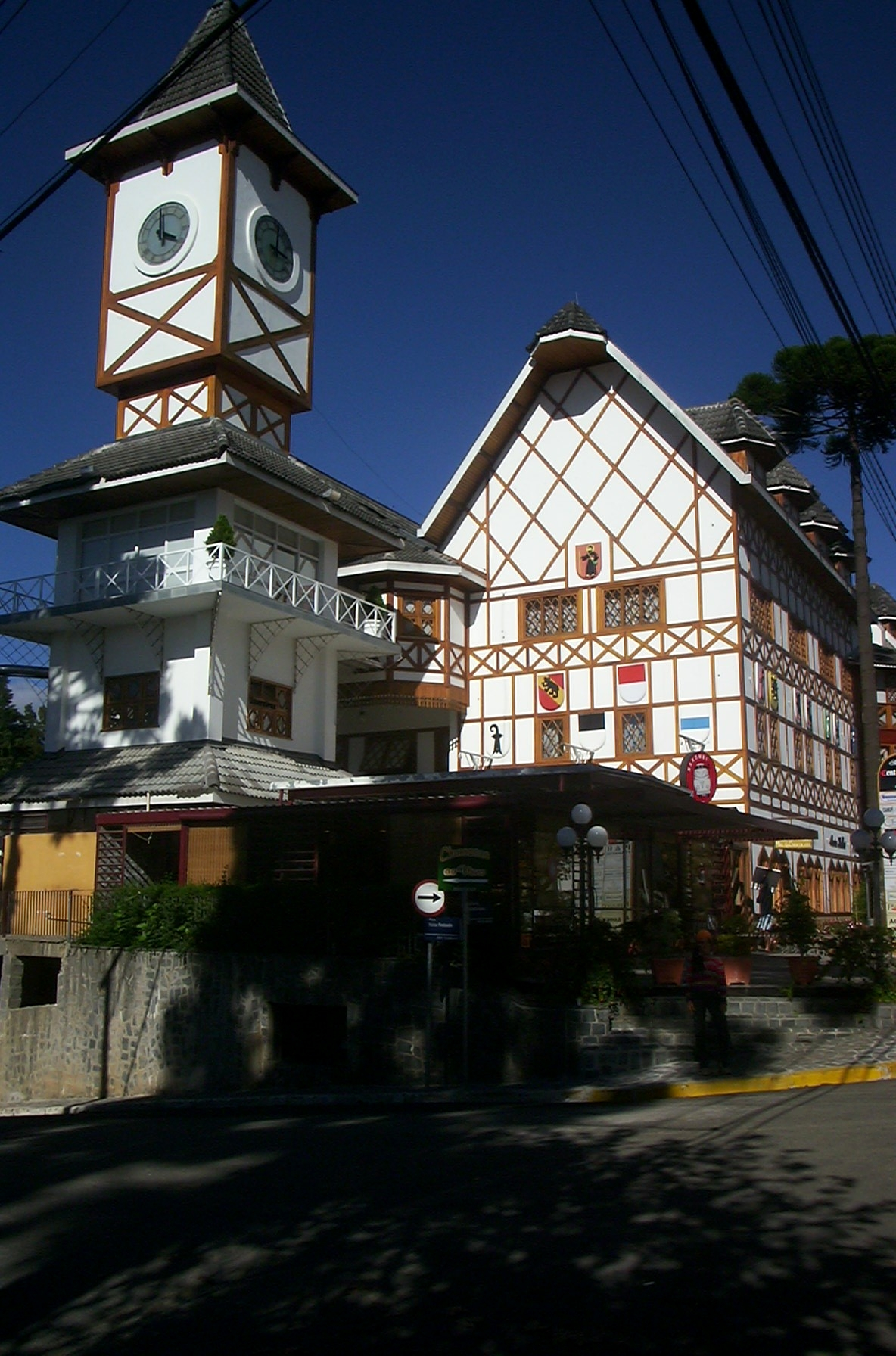
A shopping mall in a Swiss-inspired style

The municipality contains the 8,341-hectare (20,610-acre) Campos do Jordão State Park, created in 1941. It contains the 503-hectare (1,240-acre) Mananciais de Campos do Jordão State Park, created in 1993 to protect the water supply of the municipal seat. It also contains the 28,800-hectare (71,000-acre) Campos do Jordão Environmental Protection Area, created in 1984.

Campos do Jordão is located on a crystalline plateau where the High Fields are located (in Portuguese: Altos Campos) formed from the quaternary, increasing the geomorphological risks with the increase of urbanization and seen inadequate occupations as in straight slopes. These areas may be at risk of landslide. The municipality has rounded topos and amphitheaters where organic clay is found due to erosive processes and due to this constitution its characteristic is the concentration of water.

A former state governor had a winter residence in the city, the Boa Vista Palace, which is now a museum in the city.

=== Climate ===
Highest 24-hour precipitation totals for Campos do Jordão, by month (INMET, 1961–present)
Month	Total	Date
January	121.1 mm (4.77 in)	January 24, 1963
February	96.3 mm (3.79 in)	February 6, 1963
March	146.7 mm (5.78 in)	March 10, 1965
April	90.6 mm (3.57 in)	April 29, 1965
May	108.4 mm (4.27 in)	May 25, 2005
June	71 mm (2.8 in)	June 9, 1978
July	74.4 mm (2.93 in)	July 25, 2007
August	60.6 mm (2.39 in)	August 20, 1965
September	75.4 mm (2.97 in)	September 6, 1983
October	129.5 mm (5.10 in)	October 14, 1995
November	102.8 mm (4.05 in)	November 20, 1971
December	111.4 mm (4.39 in)	December 24, 1971

Campos do Jordão features a temperate oceanic climate (Köppen: Cfb, Trewartha: Cfll), characterized by warm to mild summers, cool winters and a fairly comfortable and pleasant climate year-round.

Despite being situated at a higher elevation than some of the highest portions of the state of Santa Catarina, the city still enjoys comparatively warmer winters on average, given its lower latitude. Over extended periods of time, the area also sees sporadic snowfall, which is associated with the drier mid-year air currents. Given its mild-temperature montane ecosystem, the Araucaria pine, commonly associated with Brazil's southernmost region, naturally grows around the area, specially along the higher grounds of the Mantiqueira Mountains. The city's average annual evapotranspiration rate is one of the lowest in the state of São Paulo, which can lead to water shortages during the drier periods of the year.

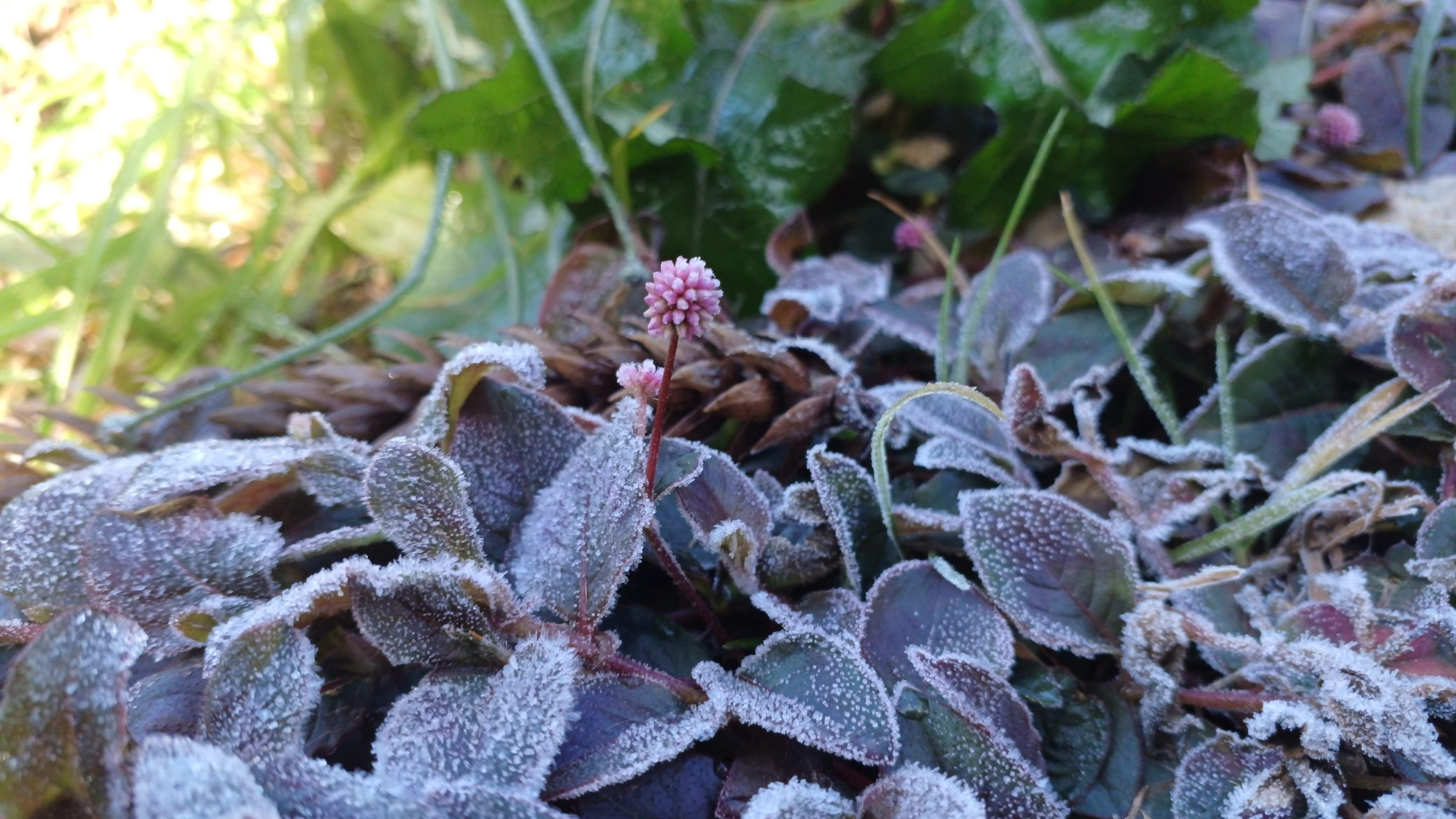
Persicaria capitata covered in frost during the winter in 2025, when temperatures in the city reached −0.6 °C (30.9 °F)

The average annual precipitation is approximately 1850 mm (72.83 in), with the majority of it falling in December and January. The averaged daily mean temperature for the city is 14.5 °C (58.1 °F); while there are many colder cities in Brazil, the prolonged duration of cooler weather in Campos do Jordão tends to result in lower average temperatures than other municipalities like Curitiba, Lages or Canela. Temperatures can drop below 0 °C (32 °F) in winter, reaching a few degrees above freezing inside the Paraíba Valley, while apparent temperatures may be even lower. Occasionally, average winter temperatures may also rise and remain above freezing, as was the case in 1999. Despite the high altitude, the overall local weather conditions do not allow for regular snowfall, though it isn't an impossibility: snow occurrences, although rare, have been accounted for in 1928, 1942, 1947 and 1966. These events appear to have occurred at intervals of approximately two decades; however, snowfall episodes of this nature have seemingly ceased in recent times. Additionally, while recorded dates for snowfall are not unanimously agreed upon, the National Institute of Meteorology (INMET), in operation since 1944, has not documented any instances of snowflakes in the area.

According to data from INMET, the record low temperature ever recorded in Campos do Jordão was -7.2 °C (19.04 °F), on June 6, 1988. Furthermore, according to the Forecast Center (CPTEC), the winter for that year was also the coldest on record. In contrast, between 2008 and 2018, the lowest temperature recorded was a considerably warmer -3.8 °C (25.16 °F), indicating that urbanization can significantly lessen colder conditions. Prior to 1988, unofficial records show even lower temperatures: -7.4 °C (18.68 °F) on June 26, 1918, -8 °C (17.6 °F) on July 25, 1923, and -8.7 °C (16.34 °F) in July 1926. During the same period, the record high temperature was 30.5 °C (86.9 °F) on September 17, 1961. Temperatures also reached 30 °C (86 °F) on two other occasions: September 21, 1961, and October 14, 1963, though limited data is available. During winter, colder temperatures are more common in June and July, even though theytypically rise above freezing in the afternoon, while ultimately remaining cool. September and April are generally considered to be consisted of more pleasant days, with temperatures above 30 °C (86 °F) being rare occurrences.

The highest 24-hour precipitation total in Campos do Jordão was 146.7 mm (5.77 in) on March 10, 1965. Other significant precipitation events include 129 mm (5.07 in) on October 14, 1995, 121.1 mm (4.76 in) on January 24, 1964, 118.2 mm (4.65 in) on March 8, 1966, 111.4 mm (4.38 in) on December 24, 1971, 108.4 mm (4.26 in) on May 25, 2005, 106.4 mm (4.18 in) on December 14, 1971, 104.2 mm (4.10 in) on December 2, 1963, 102.8 mm (4.04 in) on November 20, 1971, and 101.2 mm (3.98 in) on December 22, 1966. The highest ever precipitation month in Campos do Jordão was December 1971, with a recorded total of 606.6 mm (23.88 in). Interestingly, Christmas Day has the highest average rainfall in Campos do Jordão, with a 75% chance of precipitation; this trend of high rainfall continues throughout December and January. It is also noted that 75% of total annual rainfall in Campos do Jordão occurs between spring and summer, although variations in altitude and the urban distribution amongst valleys elicit small fluctuations in the total precipitation across the municipality, with humidity levels decreasing towards the interior of the plateau.

The local seasonal variation of cloudiness is also remarked upon: from the beginning of April to the middle of October, the city sees the most sunlight, with the end of August experiencing the least cloud cover, allowing for up to 70% clear skies. The remainder of the year tends to be cloudier, with mid-January seeing up to 77% overcast skies. The duration between the shortest and longest days of the year typically aligns with astronomical cycles.

For the latter half of the year, stronger winds are usually recorded, particularly between September and October, with average speeds of 8 km/h (4.97 mph). In contrast, the period between February and March is characterized by calmer winds, with average speeds of 6 km/h (3.73 mph). Northernly winds prevail for about two-thirds of the year, especially from late April all through September. Easternly winds, the second most common, occur for nearly four months of the year.

Climate data for Campos do Jordão (Vila Capivari), elevation: 1642 m (5387.1 ft), 1981–2010 normals, extremes 1961–present
Month	Jan	Feb	Mar	Apr	May	Jun	Jul	Aug	Sep	Oct	Nov	Dec	Year
Record high °C (°F)	29.0 (84.2)	28.6 (83.5)	29.0 (84.2)	27.0 (80.6)	24.5 (76.1)	23.4 (74.1)	24.4 (75.9)	28.2 (82.8)	30.5 (86.9)	30.0 (86.0)	28.6 (83.5)	28.2 (82.8)	30.5 (86.9)
Mean daily maximum °C (°F)	22.5 (72.5)	23.0 (73.4)	22.2 (72.0)	21.0 (69.8)	18.5 (65.3)	17.9 (64.2)	17.9 (64.2)	19.7 (67.5)	20.4 (68.7)	21.4 (70.5)	21.6 (70.9)	22.0 (71.6)	20.7 (69.3)
Daily mean °C (°F)	17.6 (63.7)	17.7 (63.9)	17.0 (62.6)	15.3 (59.5)	12.6 (54.7)	10.4 (50.7)	10.3 (50.5)	11.4 (52.5)	13.5 (56.3)	15.2 (59.4)	16.4 (61.5)	17.0 (62.6)	14.5 (58.1)
Mean daily minimum °C (°F)	13.9 (57.0)	13.6 (56.5)	12.8 (55.0)	10.6 (51.1)	7.7 (45.9)	5.3 (41.5)	4.6 (40.3)	5.1 (41.2)	8.0 (46.4)	10.3 (50.5)	11.7 (53.1)	13.1 (55.6)	9.7 (49.5)
Record low °C (°F)	5.0 (41.0)	4.2 (39.6)	2.6 (36.7)	−2.6 (27.3)	−6.2 (20.8)	−7.2 (19.0)	−6.0 (21.2)	−5.5 (22.1)	−2.5 (27.5)	0.7 (33.3)	0.3 (32.5)	1.8 (35.2)	−7.2 (19.0)
Average precipitation mm (inches)	253.1 (9.96)	206.0 (8.11)	196.7 (7.74)	85.5 (3.37)	82.5 (3.25)	38.0 (1.50)	45.9 (1.81)	38.3 (1.51)	85.8 (3.38)	133.0 (5.24)	160.6 (6.32)	240.0 (9.45)	1,565.4 (61.63)
Average precipitation days (≥ 1.0 mm)	21	16	17	9	7	4	4	4	8	12	14	19	135
Average relative humidity (%)	86.1	87.1	87.5	87.2	86.9	85.3	84.5	80.9	81.5	84.2	83.8	86.8	85.2
Mean monthly sunshine hours	106.4	93.6	99.8	122.9	137.2	157.9	180.3	177.9	123.8	137.2	128.0	97.6	1,562.6
Source 1: INMET
Source 2: Meteo Climat (record highs and lows)

== Media ==
In telecommunications, the city was serviced by Companhia de Telecomunicações do Estado de São Paulo until 1975, when it began being serviced by Telecomunicações de São Paulo. In turn, this company was acquired by Telefónica in July 1998, which adopted the Vivo brand in 2012.

The company is currently an operator of cell phones, fixed lines, internet (fiber optics/4G) and television (satellite and cable).

== Gallery ==
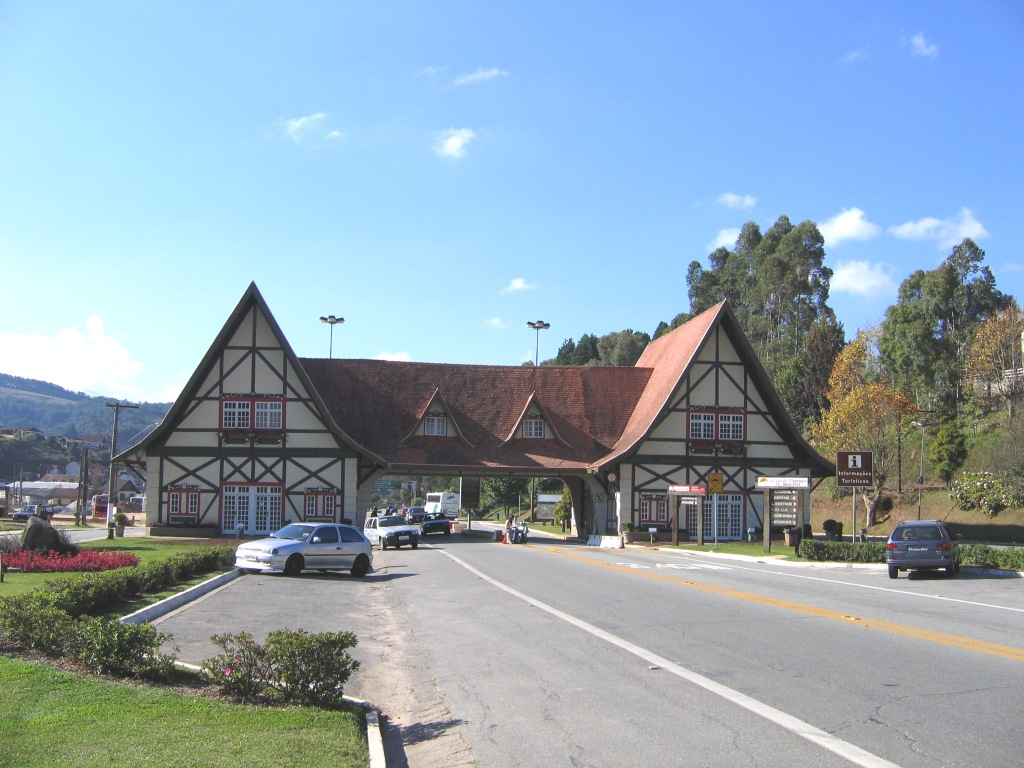
City entrance

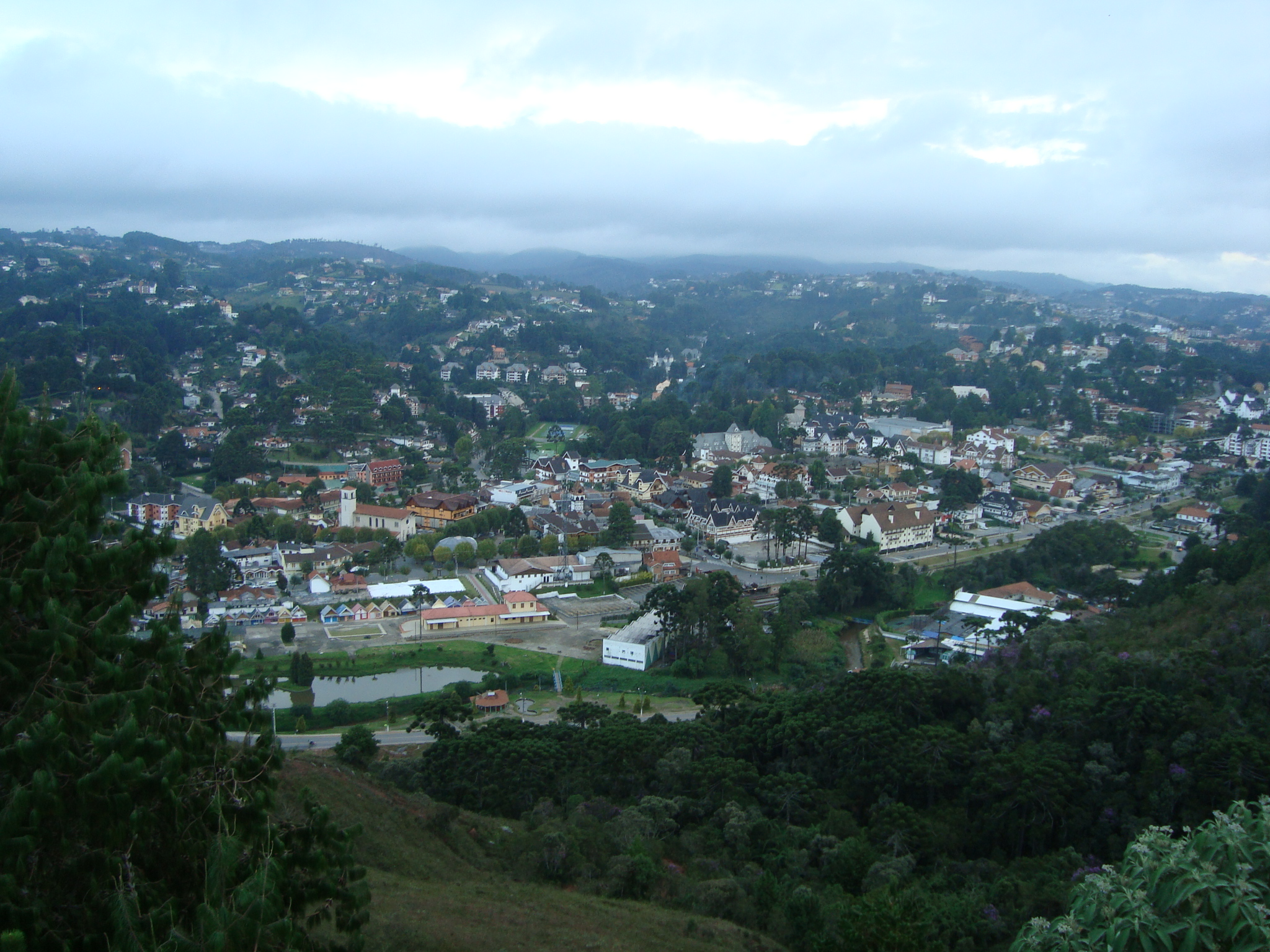
Panoramic view of the district of Capivari

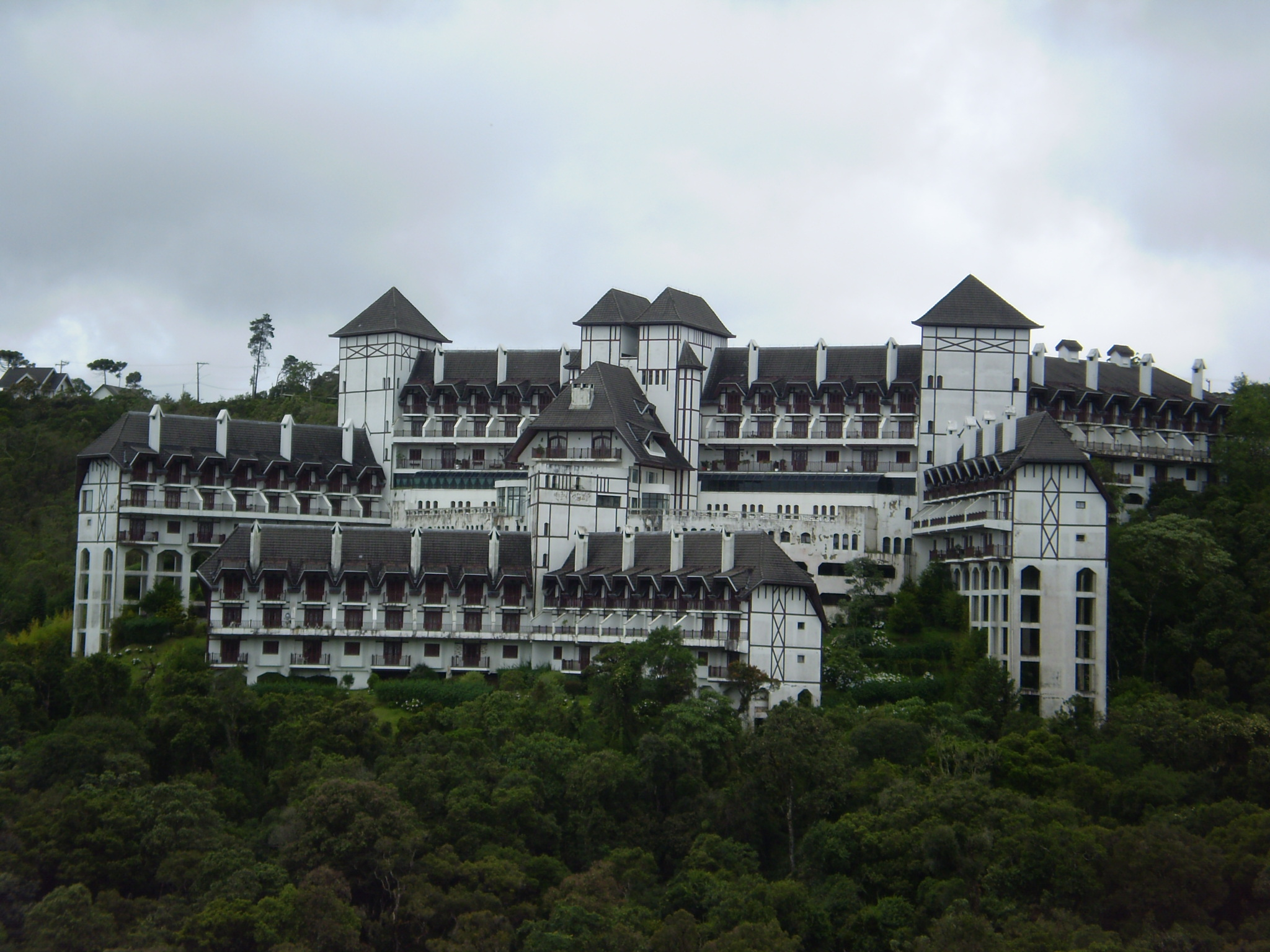
The Home Green Home Hotel

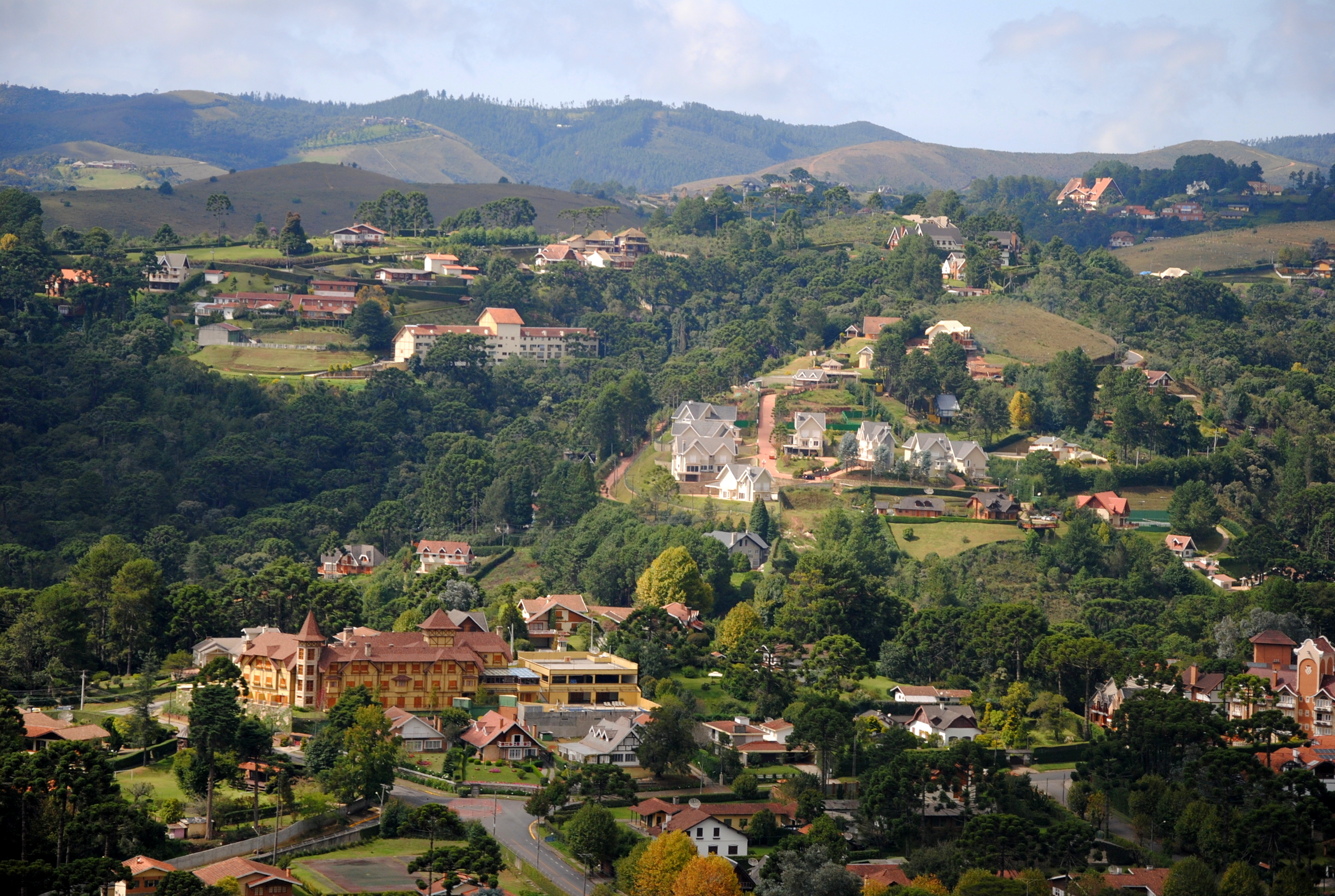
View from Morro do Elefante

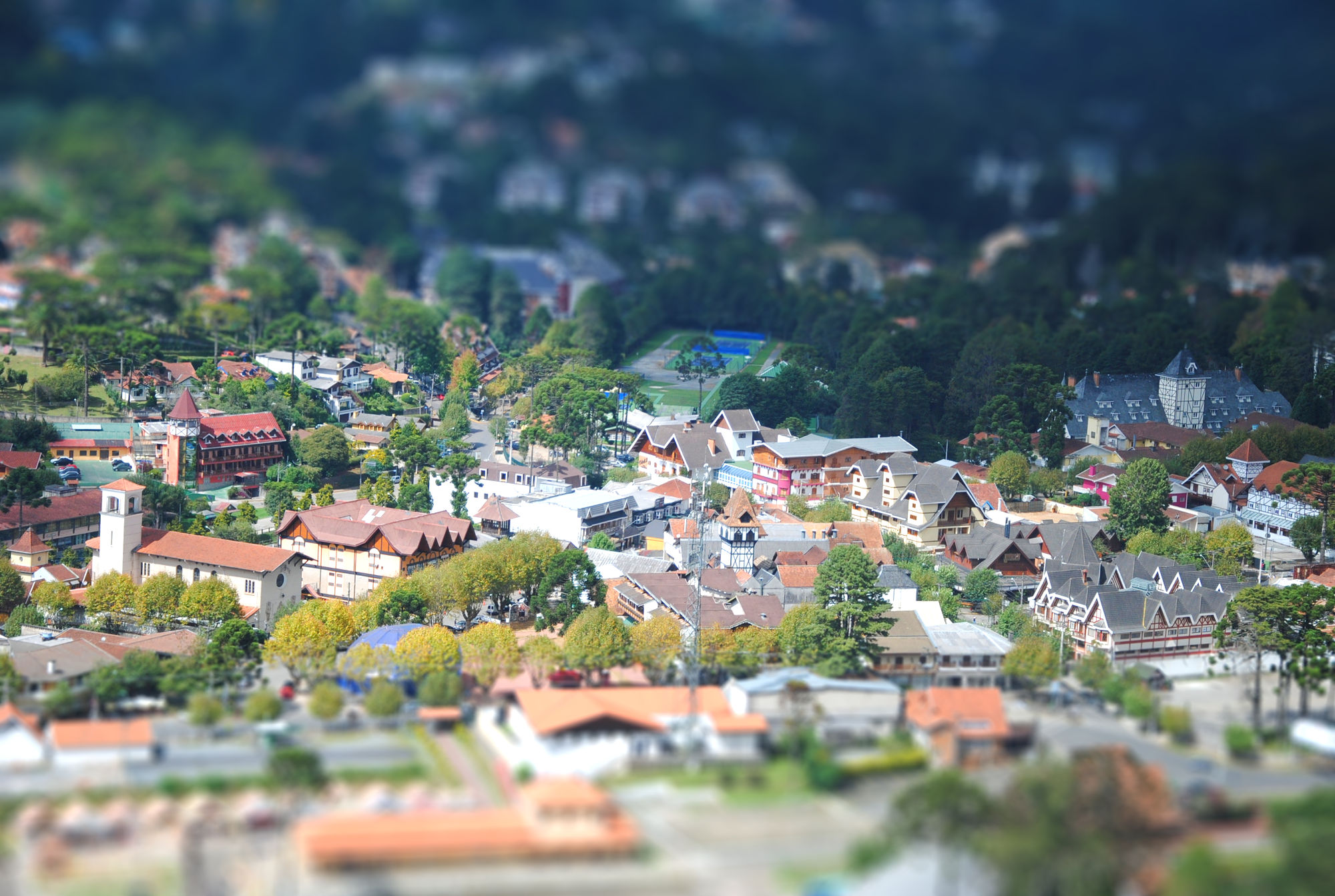
Photo taken with a tilt-shift lens

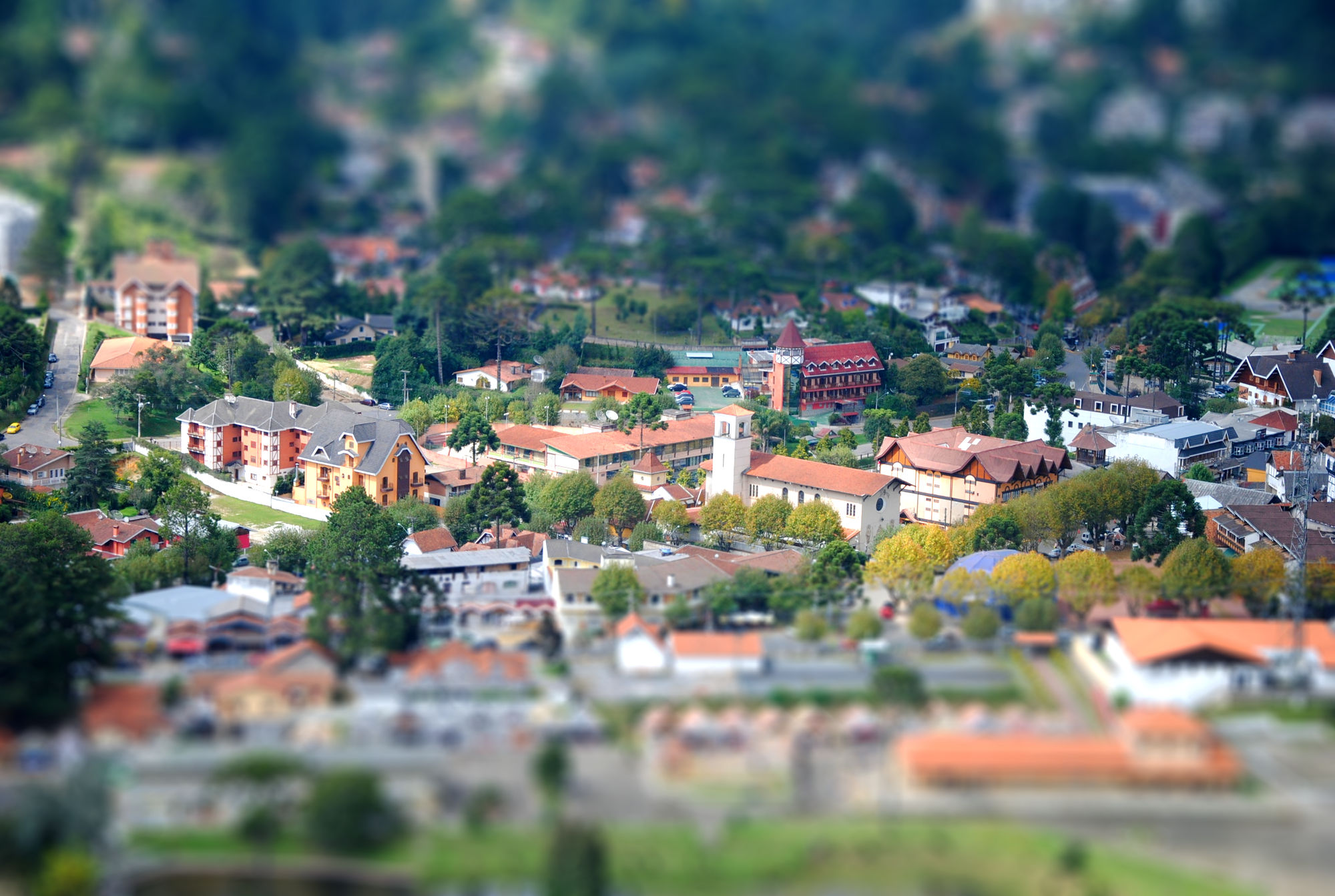
Vila Capivari district

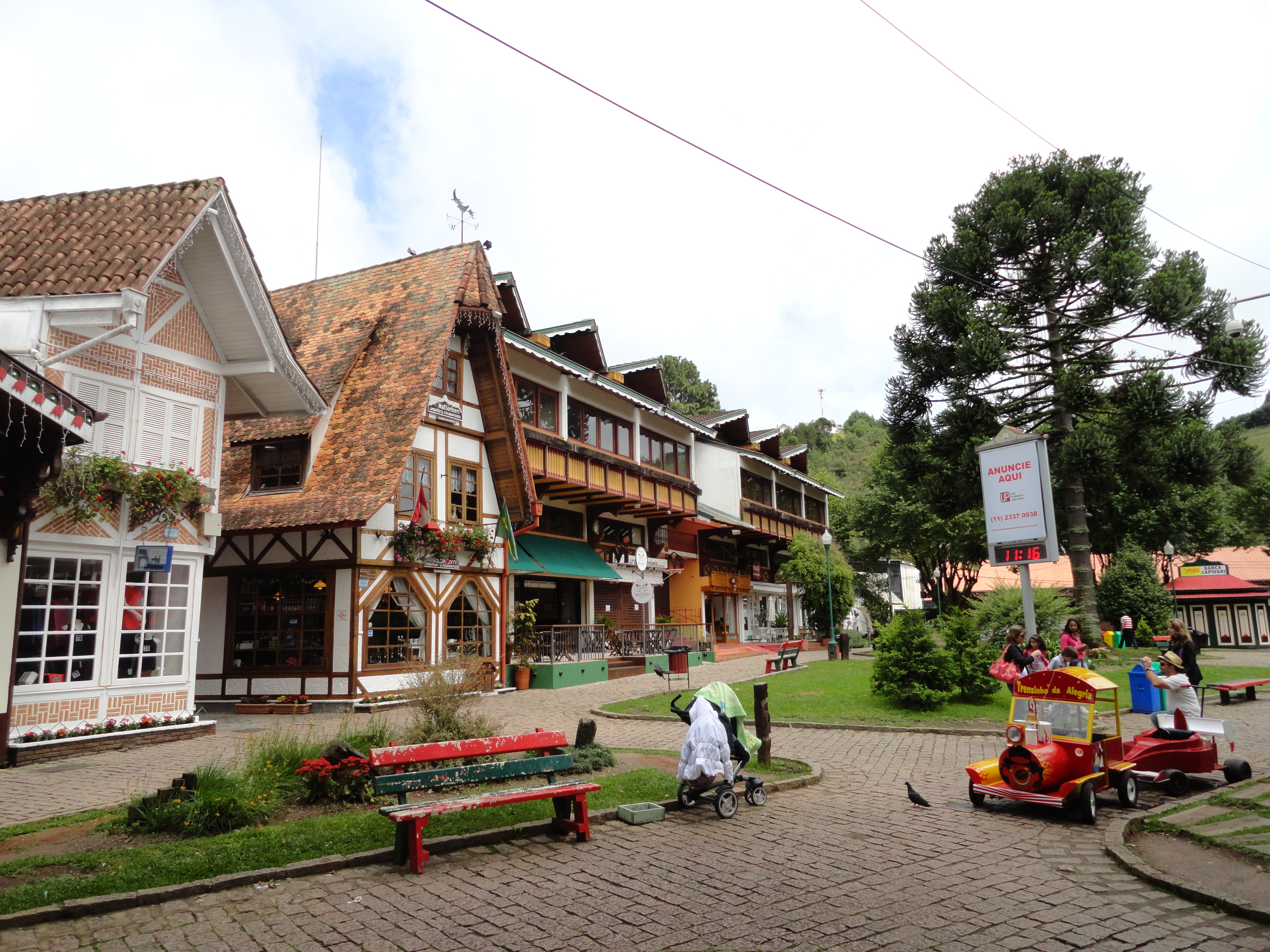
A square

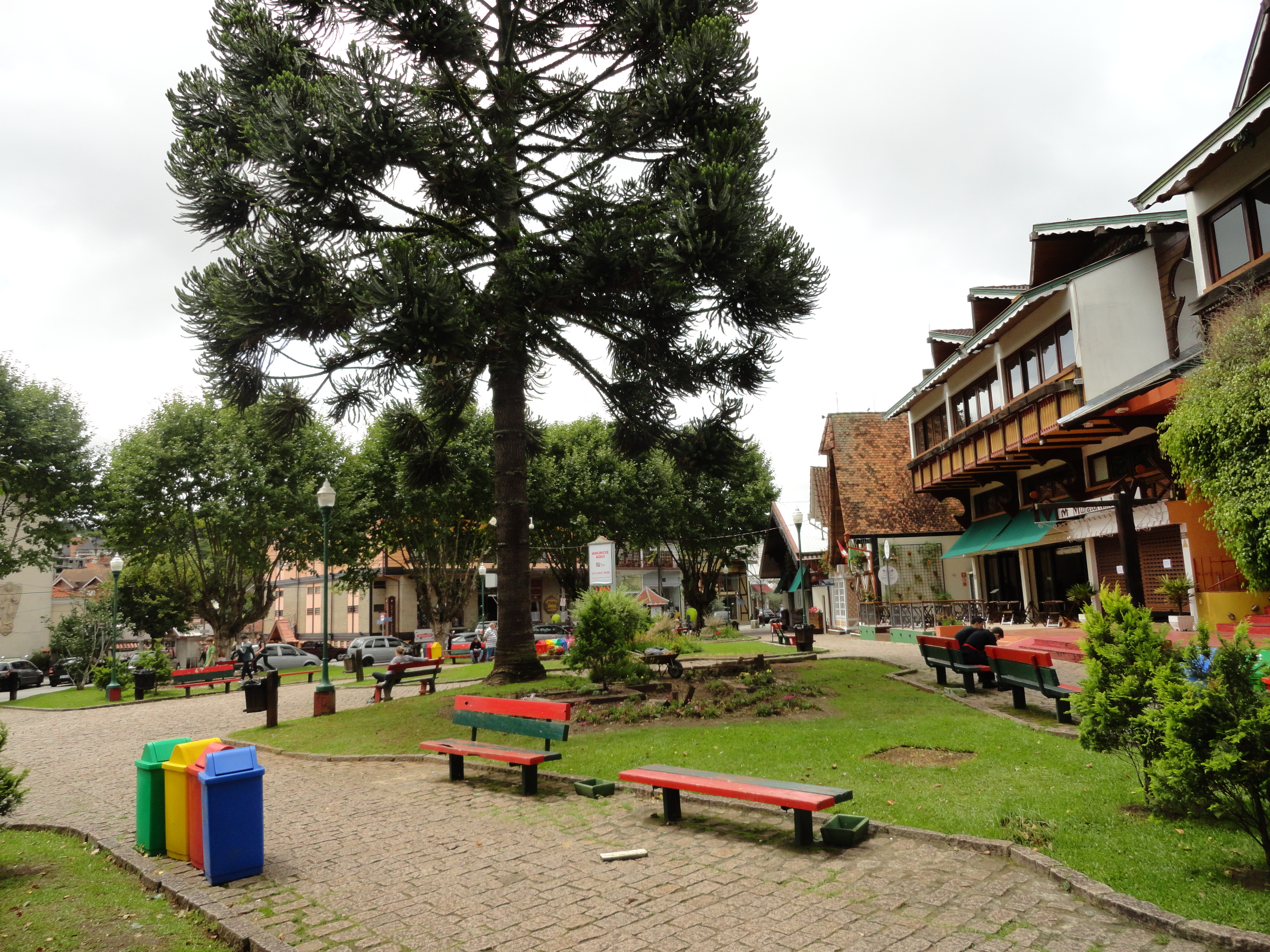
A square

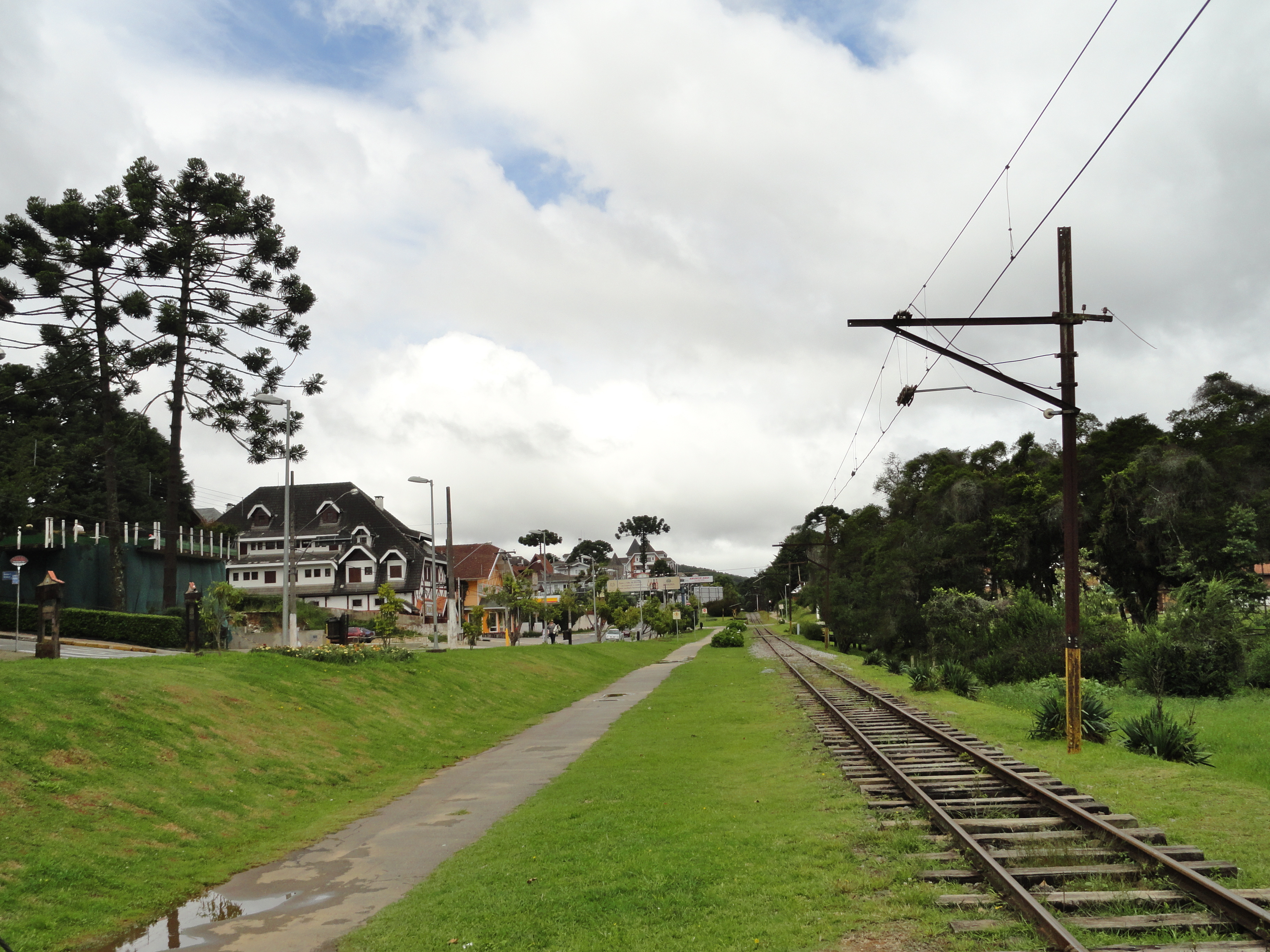
Tram rail

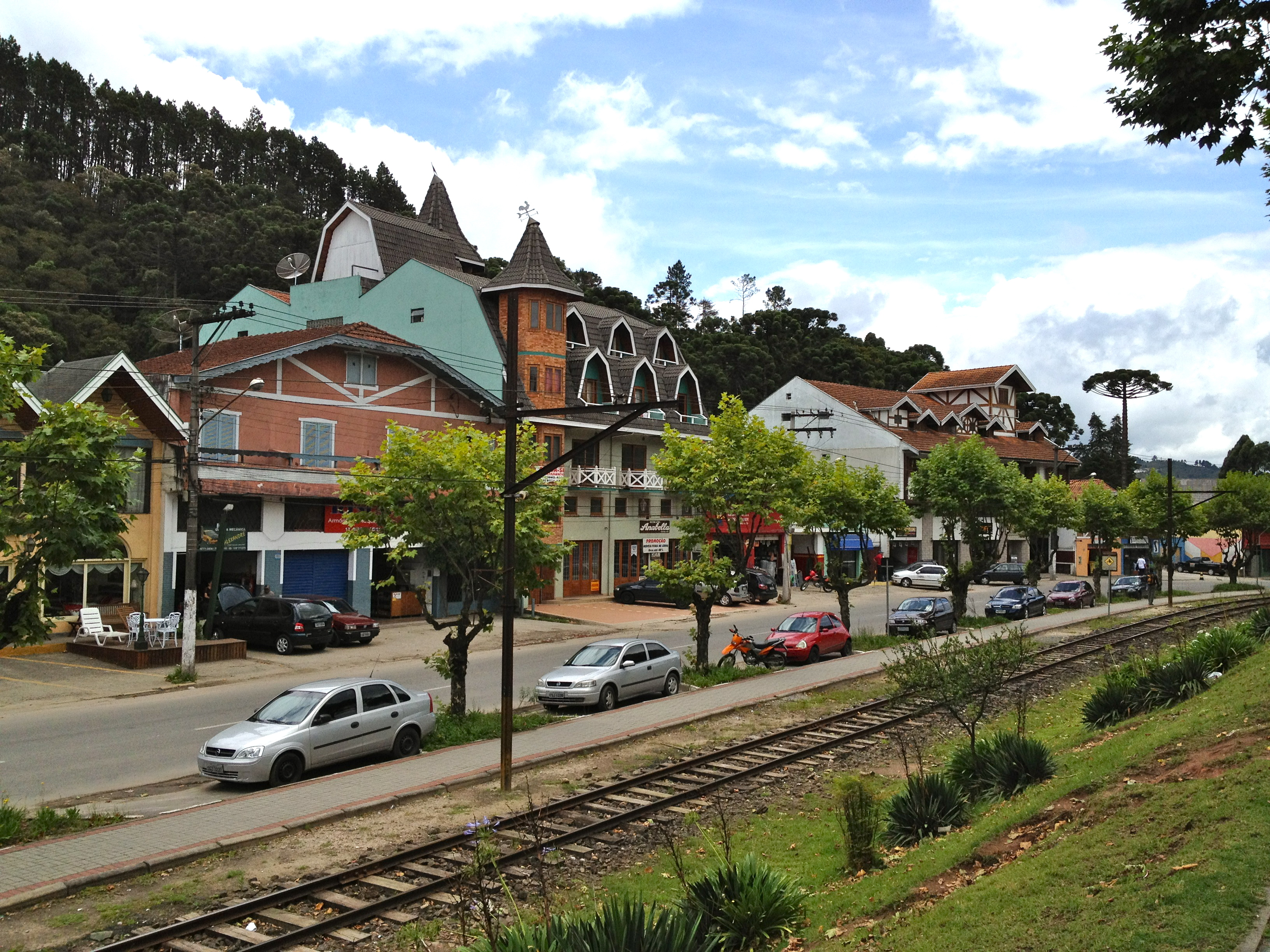
Tram rail

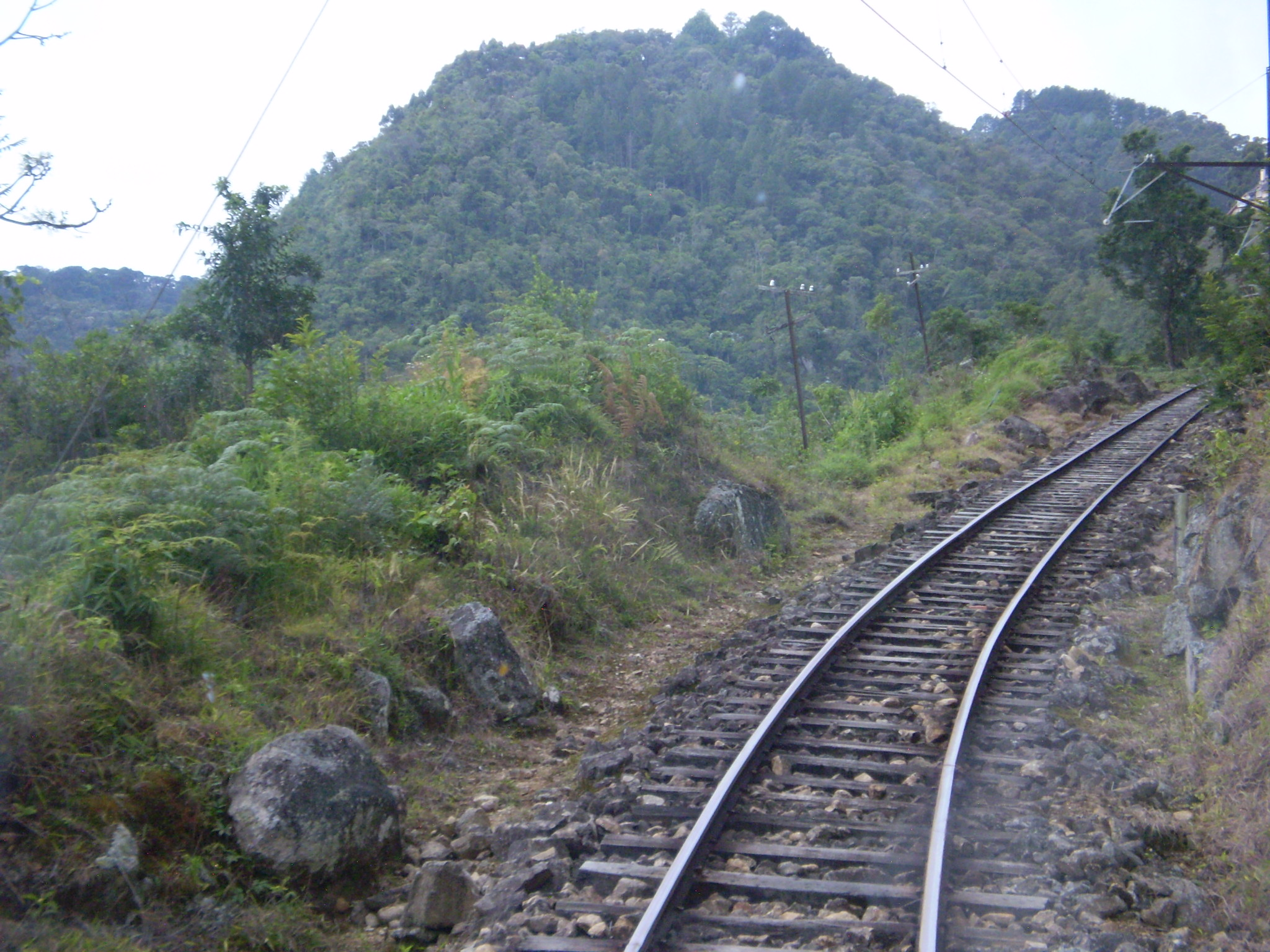
Campos do Jordão railroad

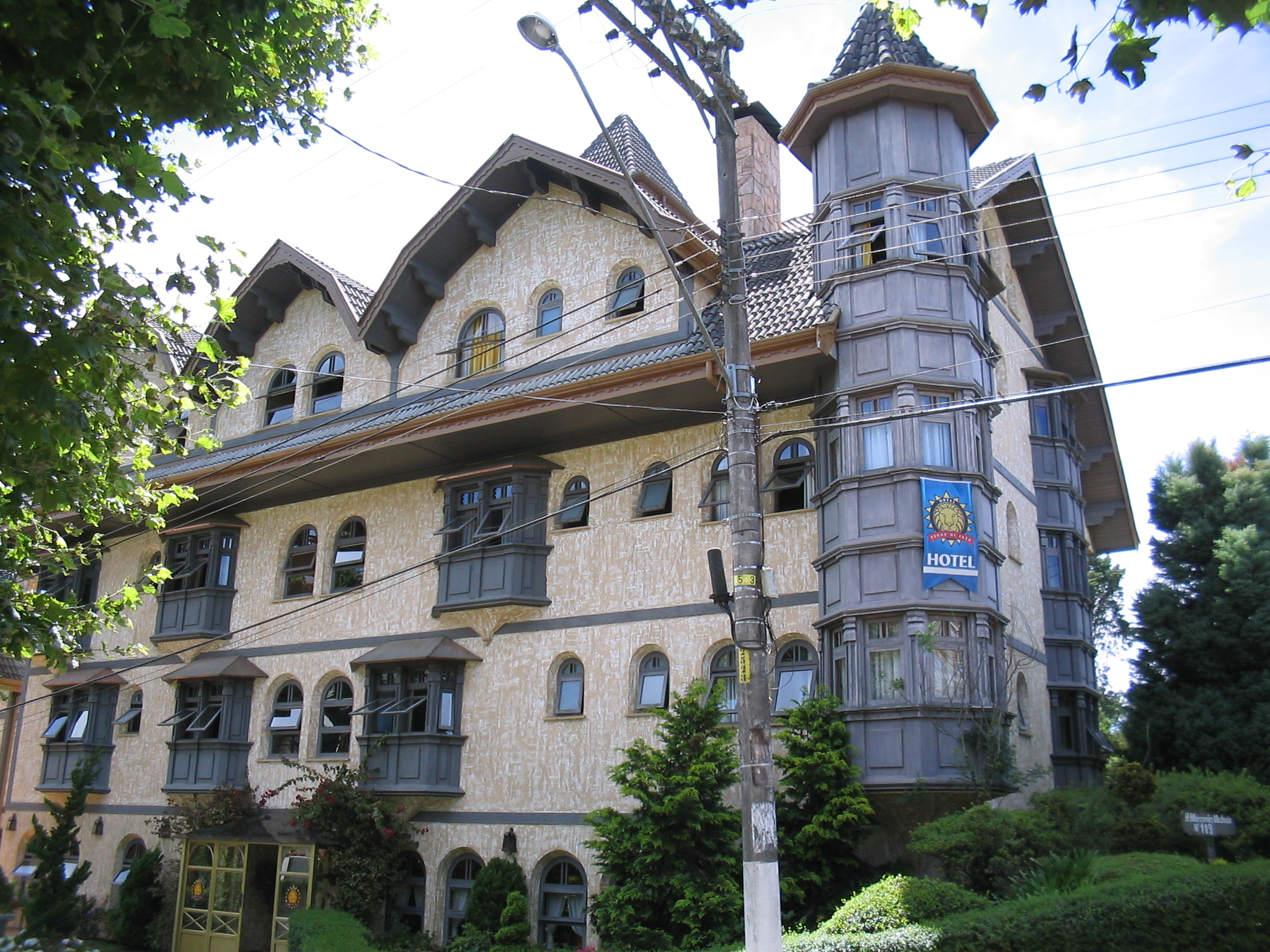
The Cristallo di Pietro Hotel

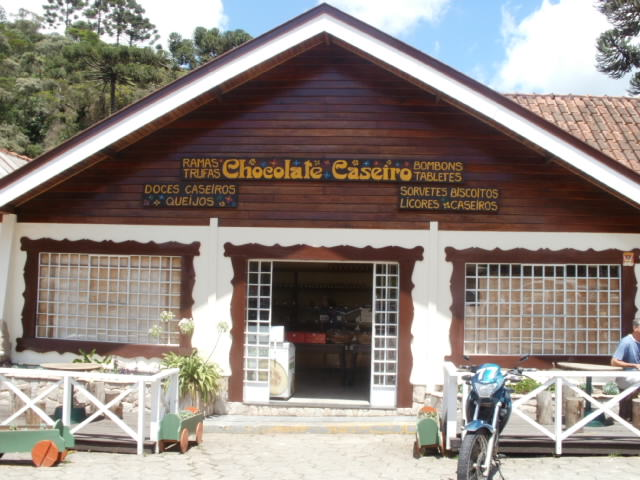
An artisan chocolate shop

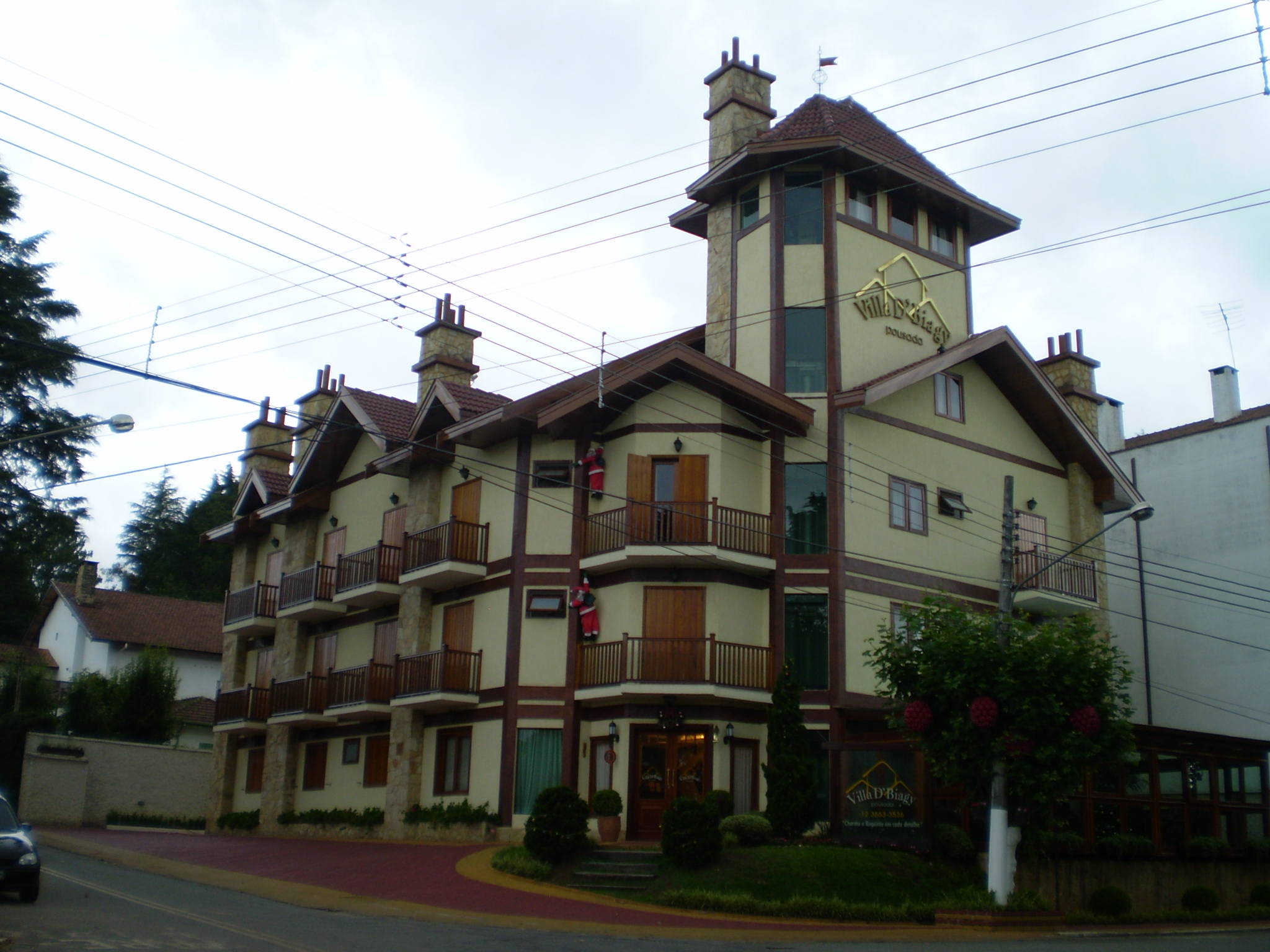
The Villa D'Biagy Inn

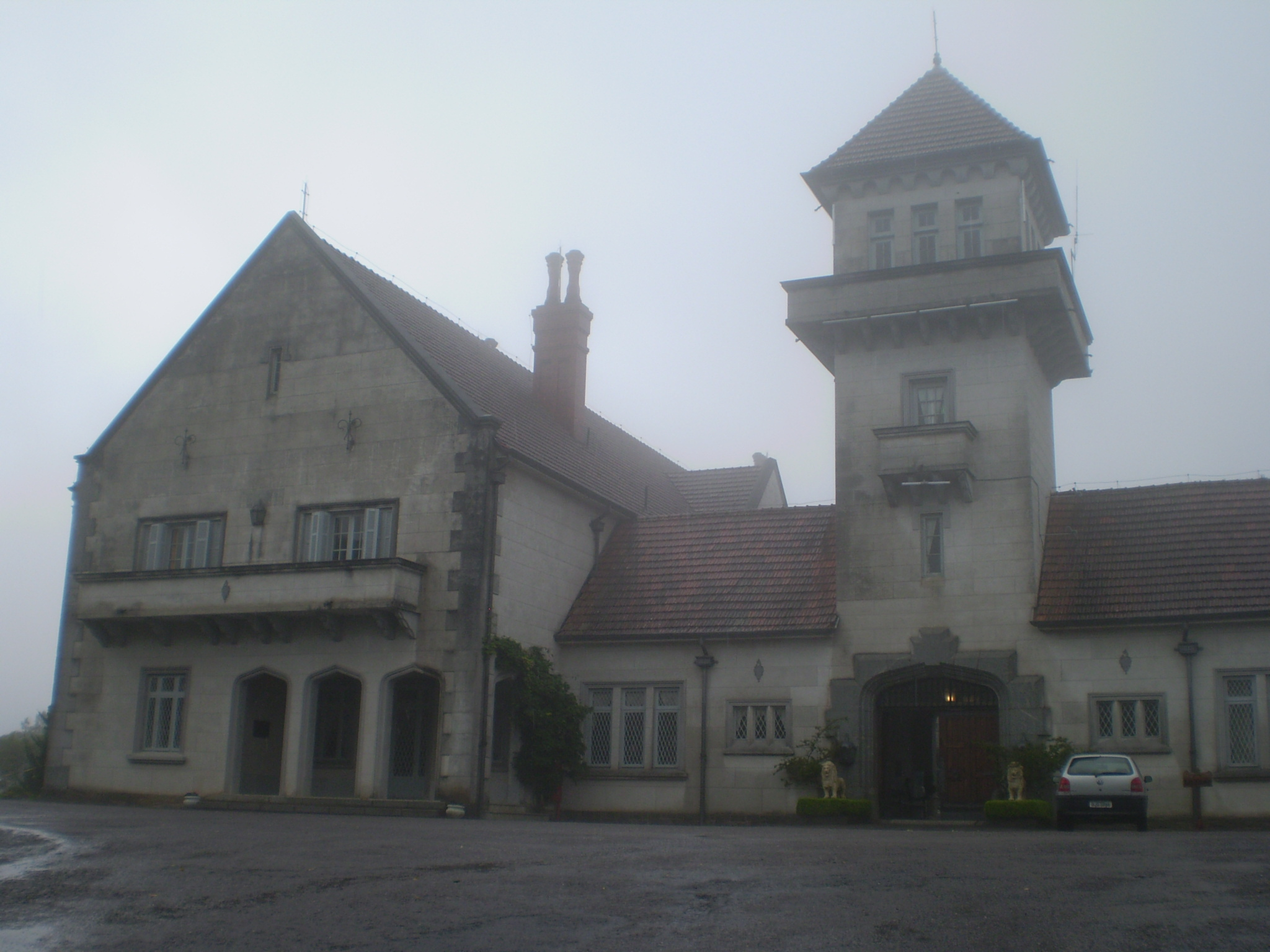
Palácio Boa Vista, the winter residence of the Governor of São Paulo

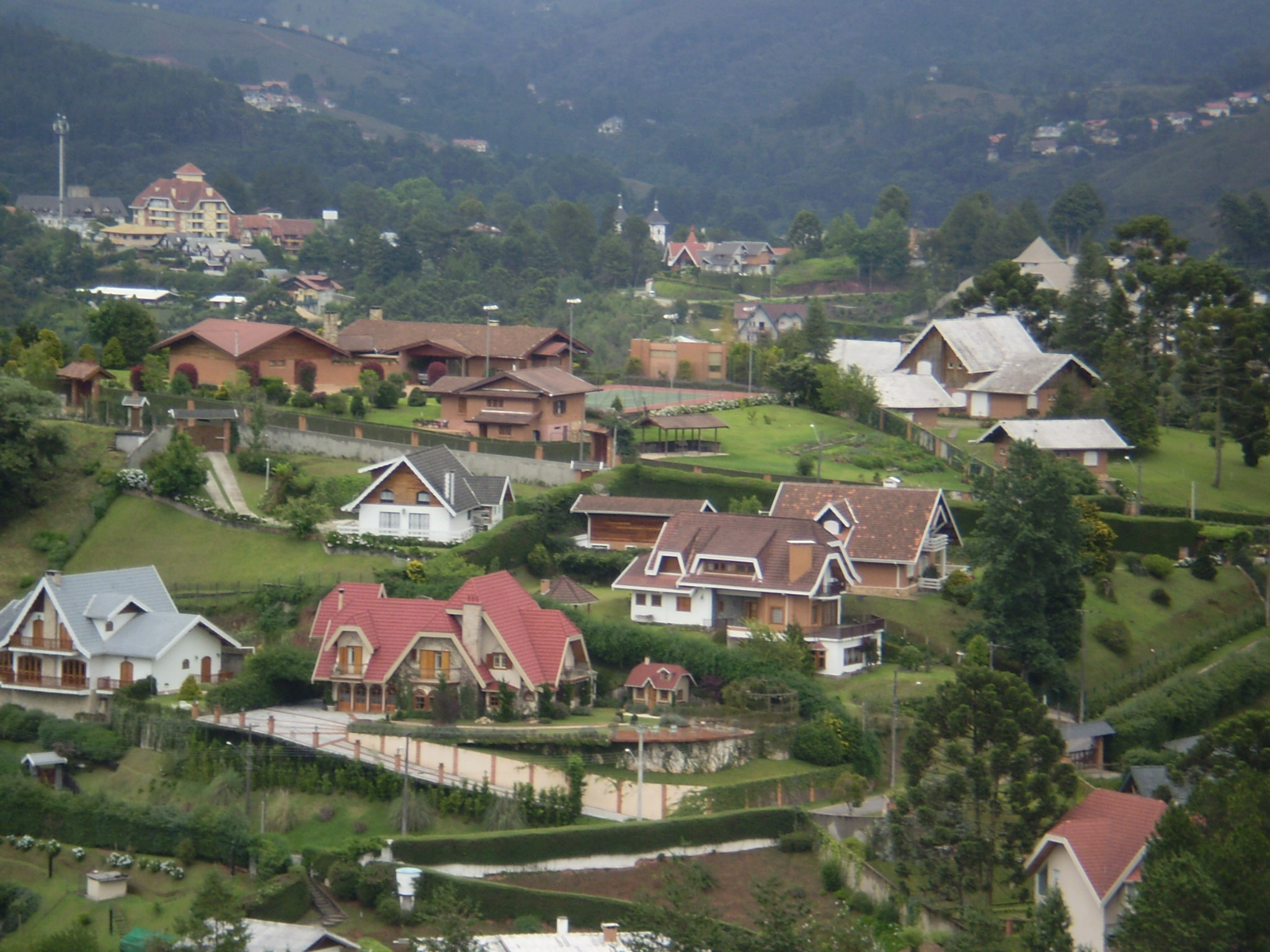
View from Alto do Capivari

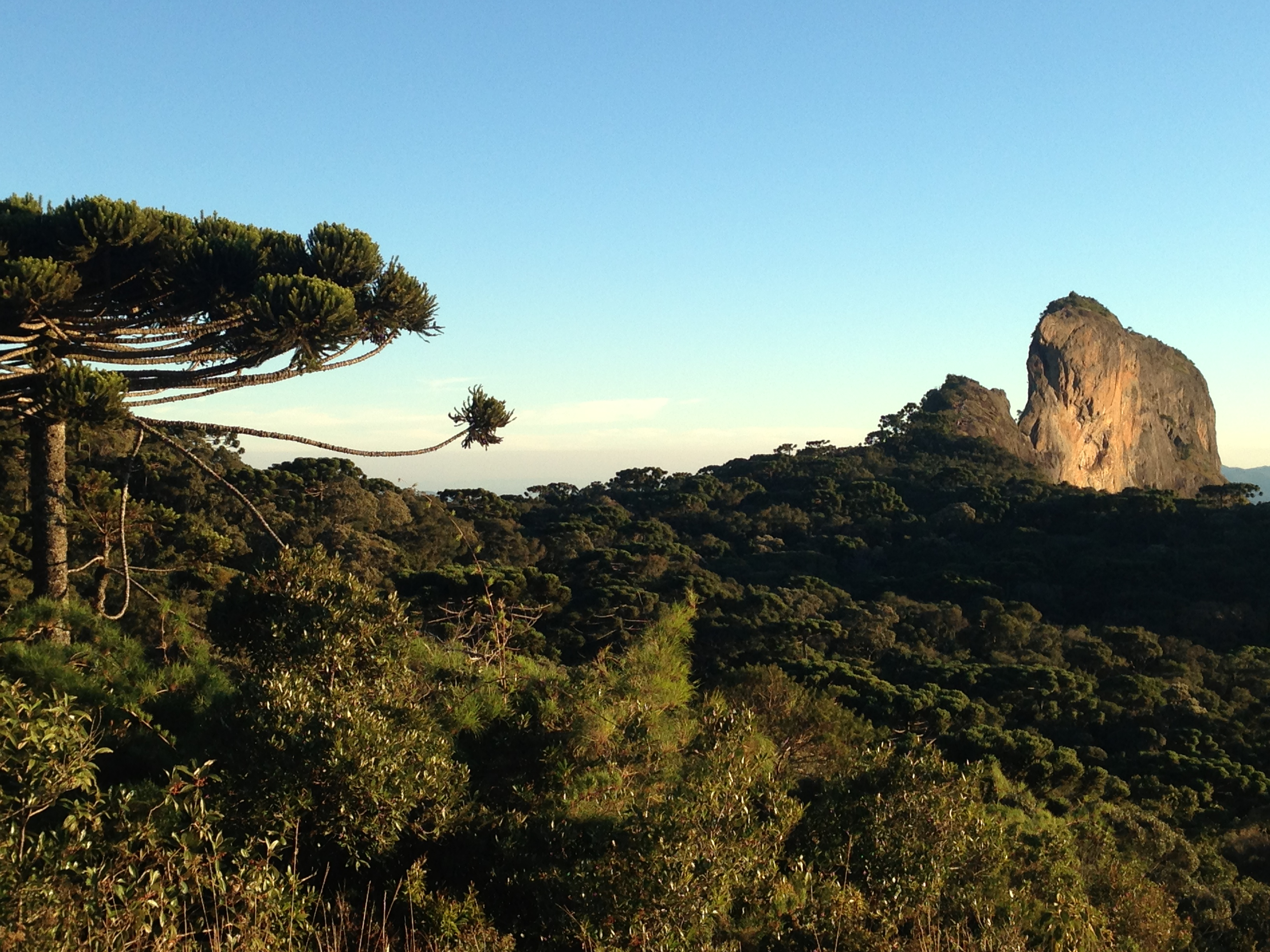
Pedra do Baú State Park, near Campos do Jordão

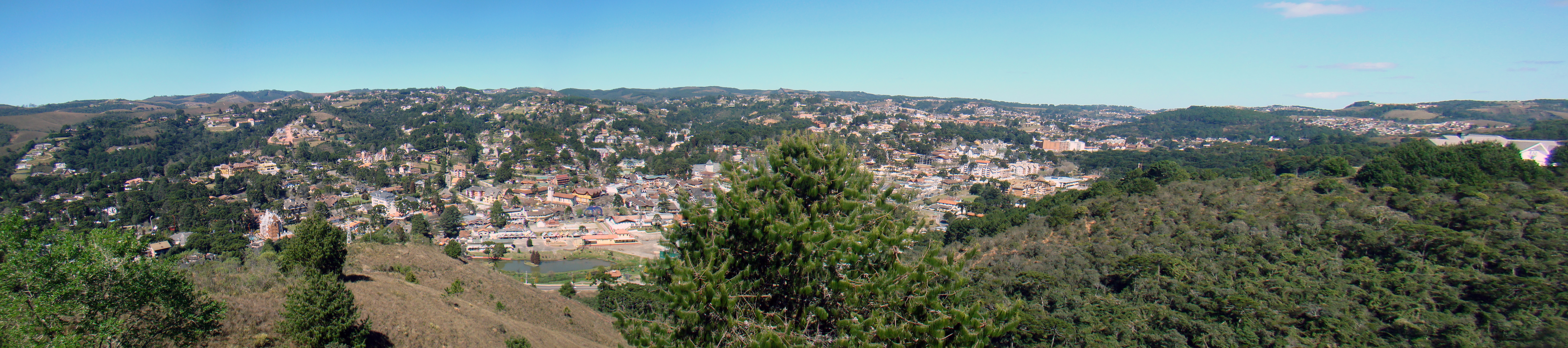
Panorama

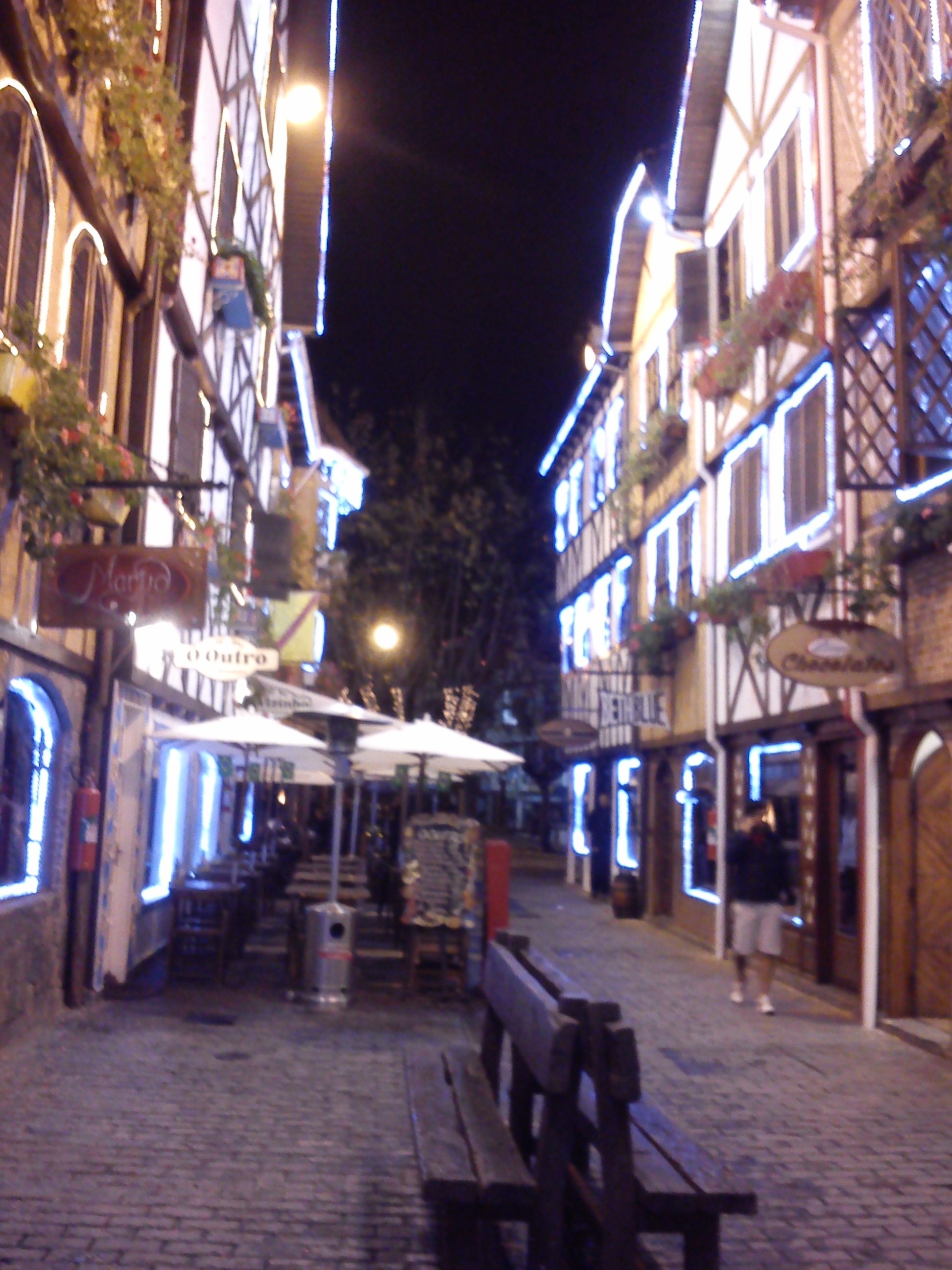
A pedestrian street

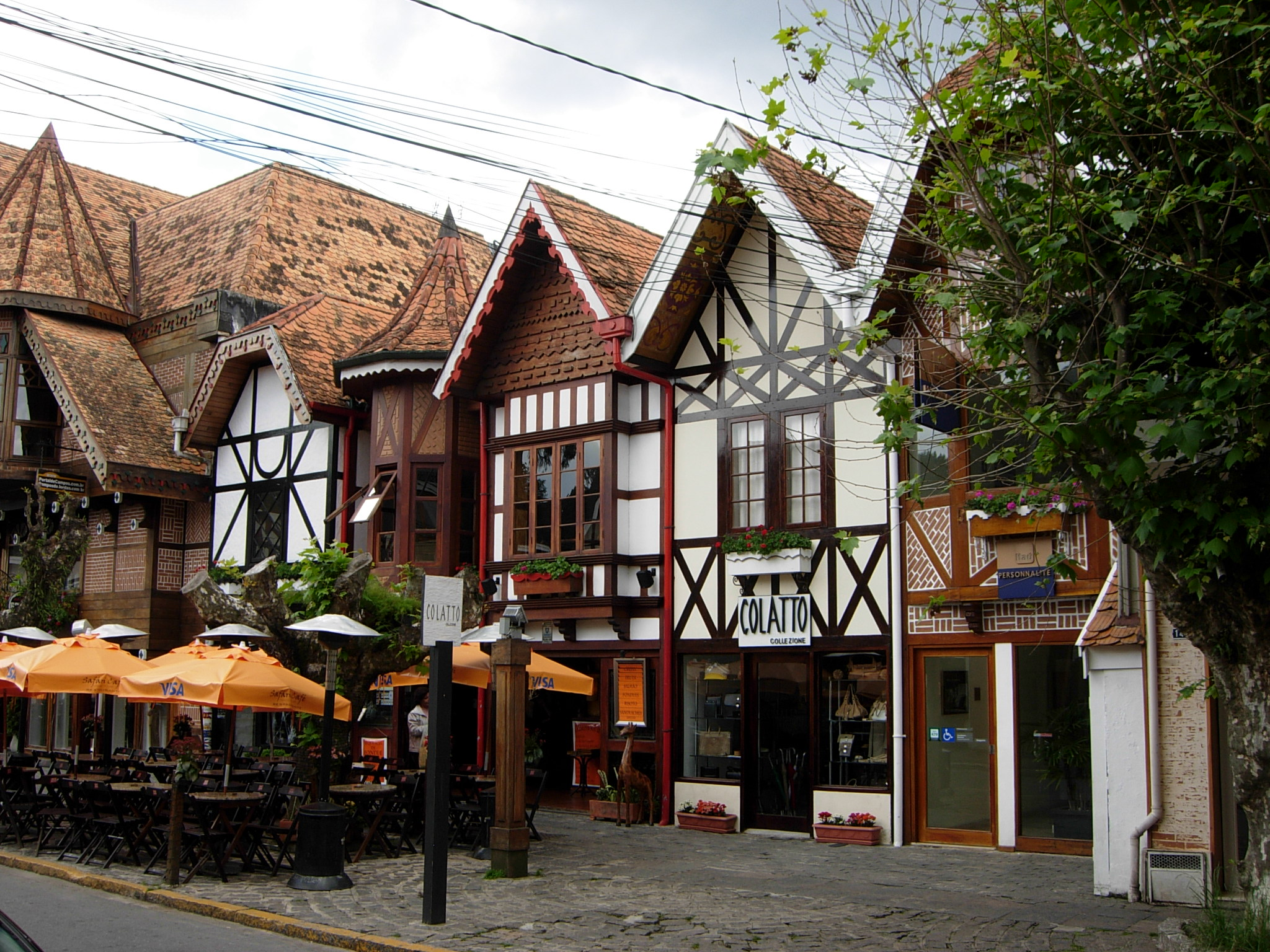
Shops and restaurants

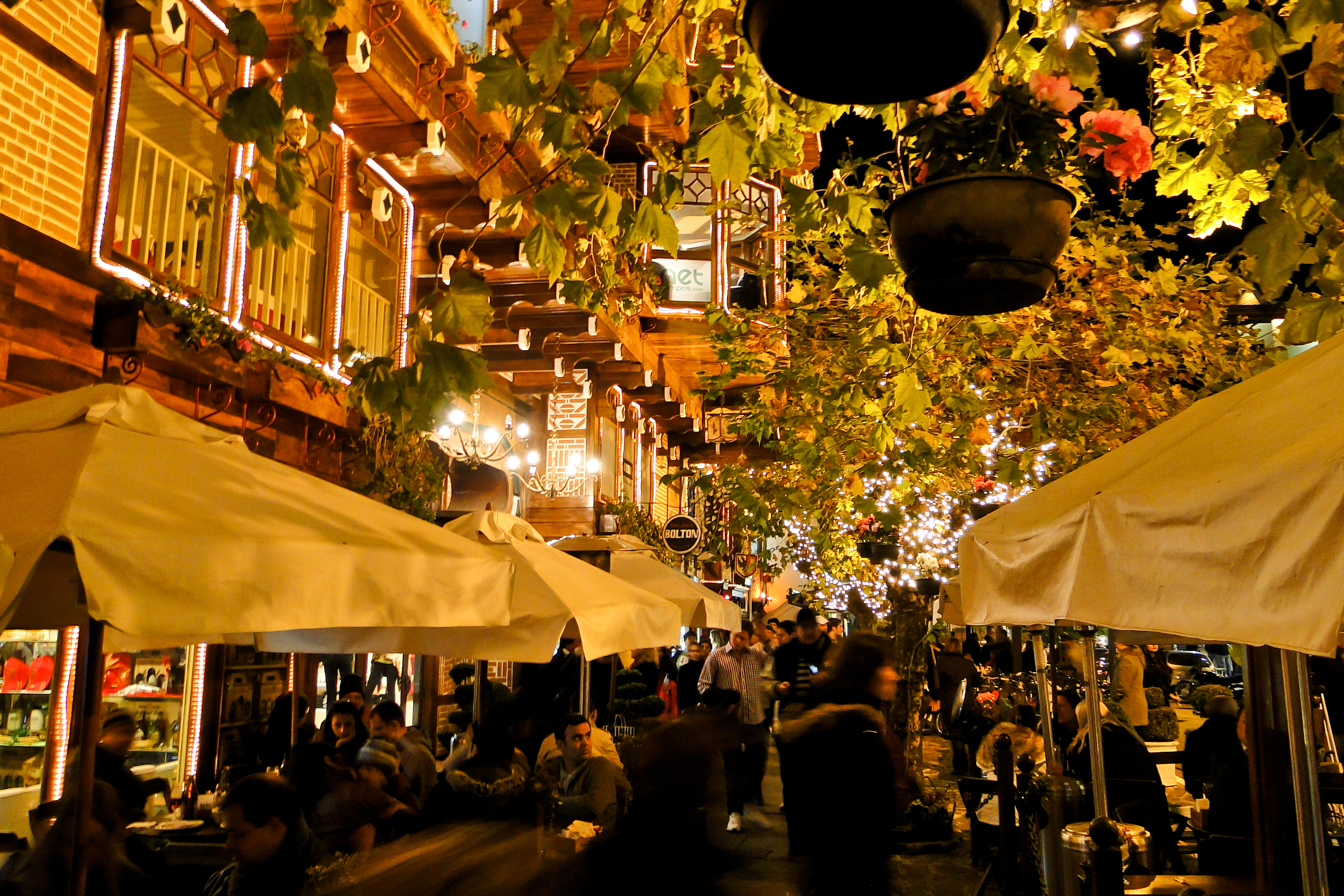
Outdoor restaurants at night

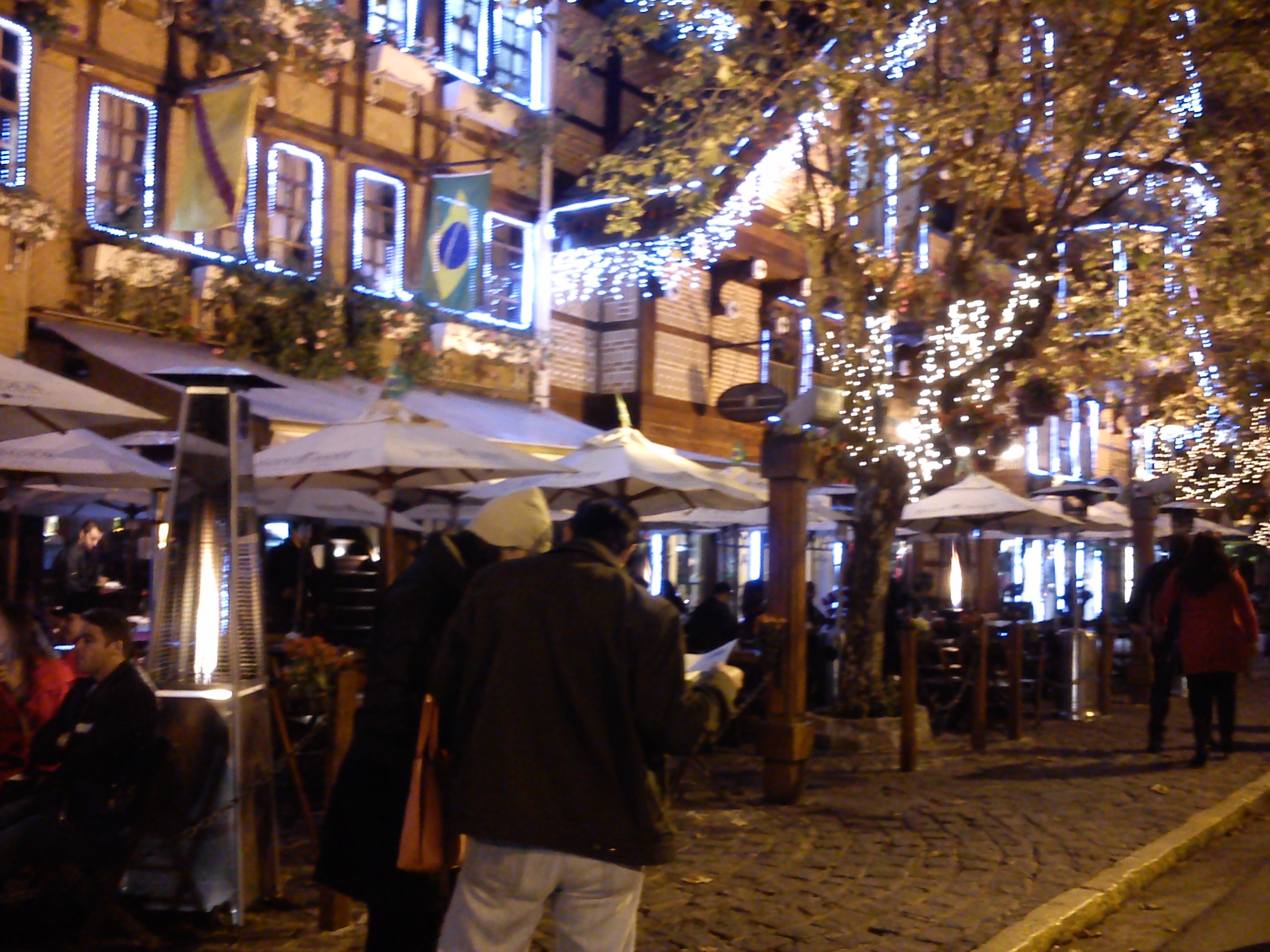
The city during the Southern Hemisphere winter session

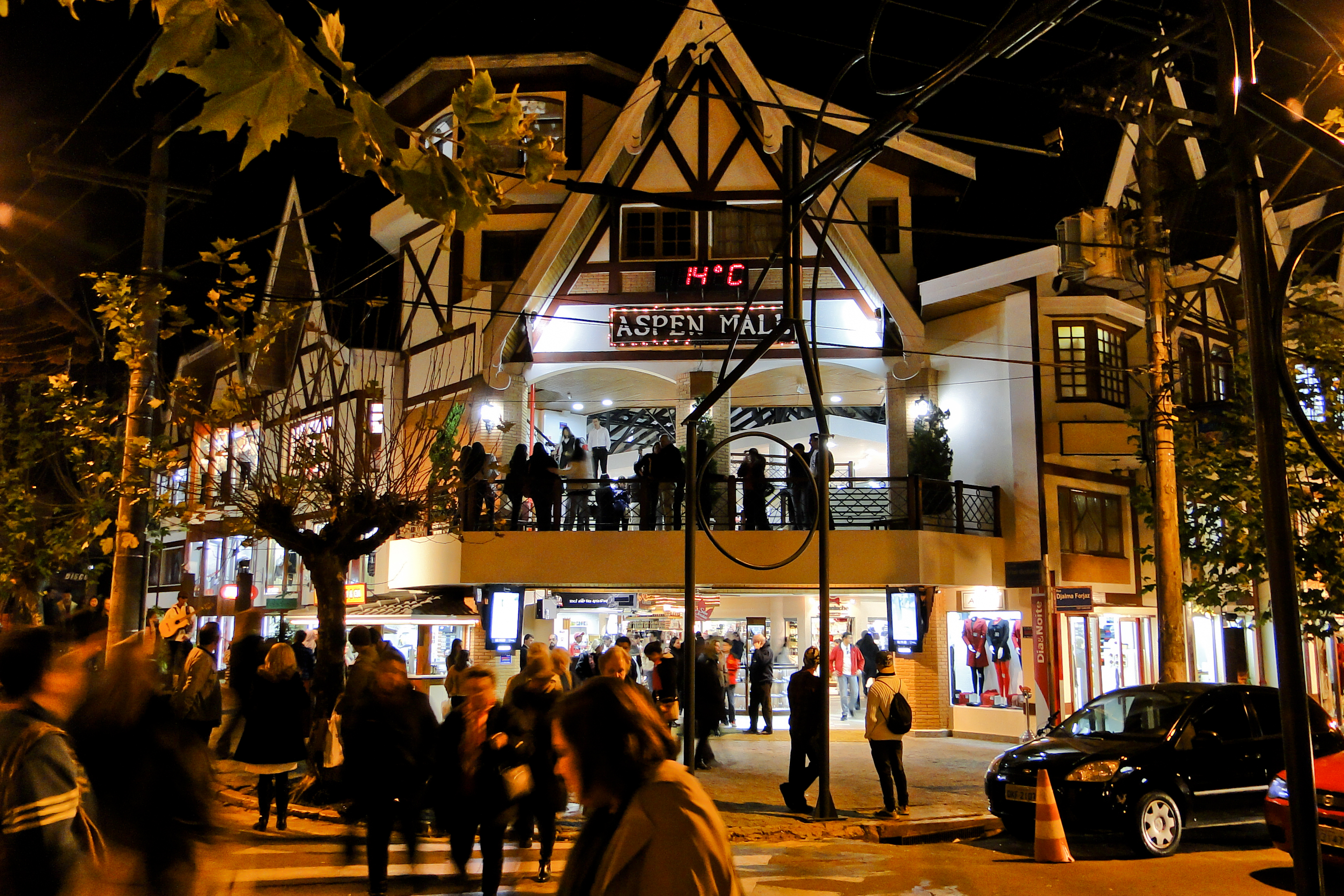
The Aspen Mall in Vila Capivari district

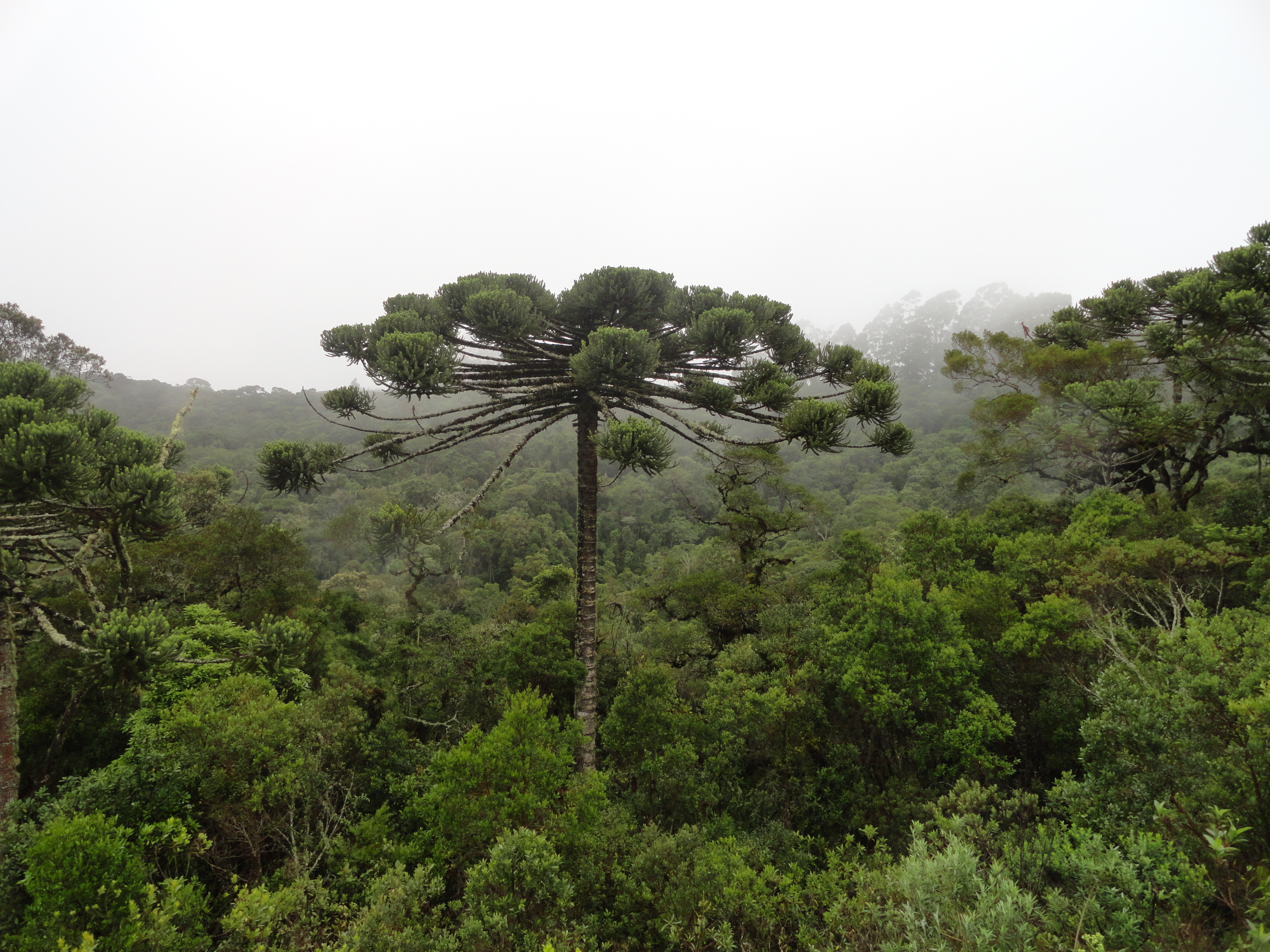
Brazilian Paraná pine (Araucaria angustifolia) and local Atlantic Forest habitat, in Campos do Jordão municipality

== See also ==
- List of municipalities in São Paulo
