= Eriko =

- Gender: Female

Origin
- Origin: Japanese
- Meaning: it can have many different meanings depending on the kanji used
- Region of origin: Japanese

Eriko (えりこ, エリコ) is a feminine Japanese given name.

== Written forms ==
Eriko can be written using different kanji characters and can mean:

- 恵梨子, "blessing, pear, child"
- 恵理子, "blessing, reason, child"
- 絵里子, "picture, hometown, child"
- 絵梨子, "picture, pear, child"
- 絵理子, "picture, reason, child"
- 江里子, "inlet, hometown, child"
- 恵里子, "blessing, hometown, child"
- 恵利子, "blessing, profit, child"
- 江利子, "inlet, profit, child"
- 枝里子, "branch, hometown, child"
- 英梨子, "excel, pear, child"

The name can also be written in hiragana or katakana.

== People with the name ==
- Eriko Arakawa (荒川 恵理子; born 1979), Japanese female footballer
- Eriko Asai (浅井 えり子; born 1959), Japanese long-distance runner
- Eriko Fujimaki (藤巻 恵理子; born 1974), Japanese voice actress
- Eriko Fukuda (福田 衣里子; born 1980), Japanese former politician
- Eriko Goya (呉屋 絵理子; born 1997), Japanese footballer
- Eriko Hara (原 えりこ; born 1959), Japanese voice actress
- Eriko Hashimoto (橋本 恵理子; born 2006), Japanese idol of the idol group AKB48
- Eriko Hatsune (初音 映莉子; born 1982), Japanese actress
- Eriko Hattori, American painter of Japanese heritage
- Eriko Hirose (廣瀬 栄理子; born 1985), Japanese badminton player
- Eriko Hori (堀 絵梨子; born 1988), Korean-Japanese singer, actress and voice actress
- Eriko Imai (今井 絵理子; born 1983), Japanese pop singer, actress and politician
- Eriko Ishino (石野 枝里子; born 1985), Japanese speed skater
- Eriko Isobe (磯辺 絵梨子; born 1977), Japanese female volleyball player
- Eriko Kikuchi (菊池 栄里子; born 1977), Japanese paralympic athlete
- Eriko Kimura (木村 絵理子; born 1961), Japanese audio director
- Eriko Kishida (岸田 衿子; 1929–2011), Japanese poet, children's author, lyricist, and translator
- Eriko Kitagawa (北川 悦吏子; born 1961), Japanese screenwriter and film director
- Eriko Kumakawa (熊川 恵利子; born c. 1971), Japanese Paralympic goalball player
- Eriko Makimura (牧村 英里子), Japanese concert pianist, performance artist, and educator
- Eriko Matsui (松井 恵理子; born 1989), Japanese voice actress and singer
- Eriko Nakamura (中村 繪里子; born 1981), Japanese actress, voice actress and singer
- Eriko Sakata (born 1981), Japanese former cricketer
- Eriko Sanmiya (三宮 恵利子; born 1974), Japanese speed skater
- Eriko Sato (佐藤 江梨子; born 1981), Japanese actress and former gravure idol
- Eriko Sato (佐藤 衣里子; born 1985), Japanese former football player
- Eriko Seo (妹尾 栄里子; born 1979), Japanese speed skater
- Eriko Shishido (宍戸 江利花; born 1970), Japanese professional wrestler
- Eriko Takano, Japanese professor of synthetic biology
- Eriko Tamura (田村 英里子; born 1973), Japanese actress and singer
- Eriko Tsuchiya (土屋 恵理子; born 1970), Japanese retired professional wrestler
- Eriko Watanabe (born 1958), Japanese jurist
- Eriko Watanabe (渡辺 えり; born 1955), Japanese actress, known as Eri Watanabe
- Eriko Yamada (born 1973), Japanese luger
- Eriko Yamaguchi (山口 恵梨子; born 1991), Japanese women's professional shogi player
- Eriko Yamatani (山谷 えり子; born 1950), Japanese politician

== Fictional characters ==
- Eriko Christy, a protagonist of the video game Illbleed
- Eriko Takahashi (絵里子), a main character of the erotic comedy manga series High School Girls
- Eriko Torii (江利子), a character from the manga and anime series Maria-sama ga Miteru
- Eriko Kirishima, a character in Revelations: Persona video game
- Eriko Fukada, a young writer of Haruki Murakamis novel 1Q84. She is often referred Fukaeri, her pseudonym

== See also ==
- Idol Densetsu Eriko, a Japanese anime series
