= Beatriz Noheda =

Scientist

- Born: Spain
- Citizenship: Spanish
- Education: Autonomous University of Madrid (PhD, 1996)
- Known for: Discovery of the monoclinic phase at the morphotropic phase boundary in lead zirconate titanate (PZT); pioneering work in ferroelectric hafnia; development of memristors
- Awards: Rosalind Franklin Fellowship (2003); Fellow, American Physical Society (2011); IEEE Robert E. Newnham Ferroelectrics Award (2020); Elected member Netherlands Academy of Technology and Innovation (2022)
- Scientific career
- Fields: Condensed matter physics, materials science, ferroelectrics
- Workplaces: Brookhaven National Laboratory; Vrije Universiteit Amsterdam; University of Groningen

Beatriz Noheda is a Spanish physicist and professor of functional nanomaterials at the University of Groningen in the Netherlands. She is known for her research on ferroelectric, piezoelectric, multiferroic, and memristive materials, particularly functional oxide thin films and nanoscale materials for electronic and neuromorphic devices. Her work has contributed to the understanding of giant piezoelectric responses in lead-based perovskite materials, ferroelectric hafnium oxide, domain-wall functionality, and materials for energy-efficient computing.

She is ranked among the top 2% of the most-cited scientists in her field.

== Education ==
Noheda received her PhD in physics from the Autonomous University of Madrid in 1996. She subsequently held research positions at Saarland University, the Clarendon Laboratory at the University of Oxford, Brookhaven National Laboratory in New York, and Vrije Universiteit Amsterdam.

At Brookhaven National Laboratory, she served as an assistant physicist on the tenure track and as a beamline scientist at the National Synchrotron Light Source. In 2004, she joined the University of Groningen after being awarded a Rosalind Franklin Fellowship.

== Career ==
Noheda is a full professor at the University of Groningen, where she chairs the Solid State Materials for Electronics group at the Zernike Institute for Advanced Materials.

In 2018, Noheda became the founding director of the Groningen Cognitive Systems and Materials Center (CogniGron).

== Research ==
Noheda and colleagues Gen Shirane and Dave Cox discovered the monoclinic phase in lead zirconate titanate (PZT) near the morphotropic phase boundary, by means of high-resolution X-ray powder diffraction at the NSLS, where she was local contact of the x7A beamline. The ceramic samples were provided by L. Eric Cross and Ruyan Guo at Penn State University. The work was reported in Applied Physics Letters in 1999. This was followed by detailed structural studies of the tetragonal-to-monoclinic phase transition in PbZr_{0.52}Ti_{0.48}O_{3}. In 2001, she and collaborators reported polarization rotation via a monoclinic phase in the relaxor piezoelectric 92%PbZn_{1/3}Nb_{2/3}O_{3}–8%PbTiO_{3} (PZN-8%PT), published in Physical Review Letters.

Noheda worked together with Gustau Catalan and published work on domain formation, strain gradients and flexoelectricity (Nature Materials 2011) that become the origin of Catalan's highly influential work on flexoelectricity.

In the early 2010s, Noheda's research group began investigating domain-wall functionality in complex oxides thin films using scanning probe microscopy. Her group demonstrated that naturally occurring ferroelastic domain walls in bismuth ferrite (BiFeO_{3}) thin films exhibit enhanced electrical conductivity, extending earlier observations of conductive ferroelectric domain walls.

The group later reported that crystal domain walls in thin films of the multiferroic material terbium manganite (TbMnO_{3}) possess a magnetic moment, highlighting the potential of domain walls as functional nanoscale elements in electronic devices. These studies contributed to the emerging field of domain-wall nanoelectronics and the exploration of domain walls as active components in future information-processing technologies.

More recently, Noheda's research has focused on ferroelectric hafnium oxide (hafnia) and related zirconia-based thin films. Her group reported evidence for a polar rhombohedral ferroelectric phase in epitaxial Hf_{0.5}Zr_{0.5}O_{2} thin films using X-ray diffraction and high-resolution electron microscopy.

Noheda's group develops oxide-based memristor devices, including ferroelectric tunnel junctions and systems based on complex oxide materials and heterostructures for applications in neuromorphic engineering and reservoir computing.

== Awards and recognition ==
In 2003 Noheda was one of the three recipients of a Rosalind Franklin Fellowship.

In 2011, Noheda was elected a Fellow of the American Physical Society for her structural studies of new phases in perovskite-type ferroelectric materials and domain nanostructures in epitaxial multiferroic films.

In 2020, Noheda received the IEEE Robert E. Newnham Ferroelectrics Award for "her outstanding contributions to the understanding of the giant piezoelectricity in lead zirconate titanate and ferroelectric relaxors, based on her discovery of their low symmetry phases".

She is featured as one of the "100 Inspirational profiles" of Lynnette Madsen's book Successful Women Ceramic and Glass Scientists and Engineers.

In 2021, Noheda became a Senior Member of the IEEE. In 2022, she was elected a member of the Netherlands Academy of Technology and Innovation. In 2025, she received the inaugural WISE Award from the Women in Science and Engineering network at the University of Groningen's Faculty of Science and Engineering.
