= Bisquert =

Bisquert is a surname. Notable people with the surname include:

- Antonio Bisquert Pérez (1906–1990), Spanish painter and restorer
- Antonio Bisquert (1596–1646), Spanish painter
- Juan Bisquert (born 1962), Spanish physicist
