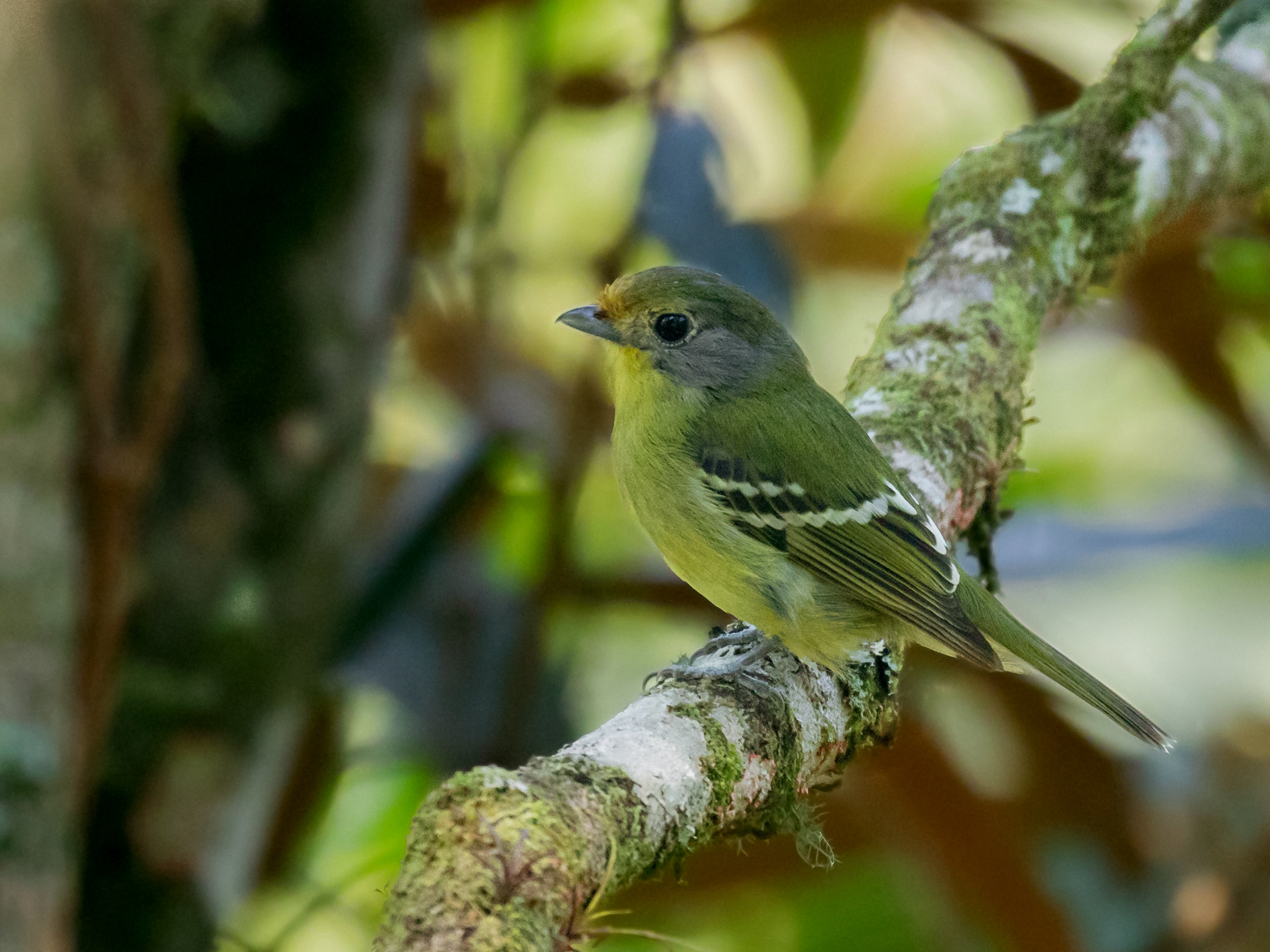
- at Iporanga, São Paulo State, Brazil

Conservation status
- Least Concern (IUCN 3.1)

Scientific classification
- Kingdom: Animalia
- Phylum: Chordata
- Class: Aves
- Order: Passeriformes
- Family: Tyrannidae
- Genus: Piprites
- Species: P. chloris

Binomial name
- Piprites chloris (Temminck, 1822)

= Wing-barred piprites =

Species of bird

The wing-barred piprites (Piprites chloris) is a species of bird in subfamily Pipritinae of family Tyrannidae, the tyrant flycatchers. It is found in every mainland South American country except Chile and Uruguay.

== Taxonomy and systematics ==
The wing-barred piprites shares genus Piprites with the grey-headed piprites (P. griseiceps) and the black-capped piprites (P. pileata). The grey-headed and wing-barred piprites form a superspecies.

The wing-barred piprites has these seven subspecies:

- P. c. antioquiae Chapman, 1924
- P. c. perijana Phelps, WH & Phelps, WH Jr, 1949
- P. c. tschudii (Cabanis, 1874)
- P. c. chlorion (Cabanis, 1847)
- P. c. grisescens Novaes, 1964
- P. c. boliviana Chapman, 1924
- P. c. chloris (Temminck, 1822)

== Description ==
The wing-barred piprites is 12.5 to 14 cm (4.9 to 5.5 in) long and weighs 15 to 21 g (0.53 to 0.74 oz). The sexes have the same plumage. Adults of the nominate subspecies P. c. chloris have a golden forehead, an olive-green crown, and a slightly gray olive-green nape. They have golden lores and a bold yellow eyering. Their upperparts and tail are olive-green with paler green edges on the tail feathers. Their wings are olive-green with paler green edges on the flight feathers and large creamy to white ends on the wing coverts that show as bars on the closed wing. Their underparts are yellow with an olive cast on the breast.

The other subspecies of the wing-barred piprites differ from the nominate and each other thus:

- P. c. antioquiae: brighter green upperparts than nominate with less gray on the nape and clearer, brighter, yellow underparts with less olive
- P. c. perijana: brighter olive upperparts than nominate, with gray nape and sides of the neck and wide yellowish white tips on the tail feathers
- P. c. tschudii: brighter olive upperparts than nominate, with gray nape and sides of the neck
- P. c. chlorion: yellow throat, light grayish underparts with whiter belly than nominate and yellowish undertail coverts
- P. c. grisescens: grayer overall than nominate
- P. c. boliviana: like chlorion with yellower breast and vent and a gray band across the belly

All subspecies have a dark iris, a grayish bill, and light pinkish gray legs and feet.

== Distribution and habitat ==
The wing-barred piprites has a disjunct distribution; the range of P. c. chloris is separate from all the others'. The subspecies are found thus:

- P. c. antioquiae: northern end of Colombia's Central Andes and the middle Magdalena River Valley
- P. c. perijana: Serranía del Perijá on the Colombia-Venezuela border and eastern Andes in Venezuela's Táchira state
- P. c. tschudii: Guainía Department in extreme eastern Colombia, southern Amazonas state in extreme southern Venezuela, western and central Amazonian Brazil to the Negro and lower Juruá rivers, and south through eastern Ecuador to Junín Department in Peru
- P. c. chlorion: Venezuelan Coastal Range, from eastern Venezuela's Amazonas and Bolívar states south into eastern Colombia and east through the Guianas and northern Brazil from the lower Negro and lower Madeira rivers to the Atlantic
- P. c. grisescens: eastern Pará and Maranhão states in northeastern Brazil
- P. c. boliviana: southwestern Amazonian Brazil between the upper Juruá and upper Madeira rivers; northern and eastern Bolivia; population in southeastern Peru might be this subspecies
- P. c. chloris: eastern Brazil from southern Mato Grosso do Sul east to São Paulo state and south to northern Rio Grande do Sul, eastern Paraguay, and Argentina's Misiones Province; intermittently along the Brazilian coast from Pernambuco to Santa Catarina

The wing-barred piprites inhabits humid primary forest and mature secondary woodland, where it favors a dense understory and also vine tangles in the canopy. In the south it occurs in Araucaria forest and in the north cloudforest. In elevation in Brazil it mostly occurs from sea level to 1,000 m (3,300 ft) but locally is found as high as 1,700 m (5,600 ft). In Venezuela it ranges between 350 and 2,000 m (1,100 and 6,600 ft). It reaches 800 m (2,600 ft) in Colombia, 1,100 m (3,600 ft) in Ecuador, and 1,500 m (4,900 ft) in Peru.

== Behavior ==
=== Movement ===
The wing-barred piprites is a year-round resident throughout its range.

=== Feeding ===
The wing-barred piprites' diet has not been detailed but appears to be mostly insects with some small fruits. It gleans prey from foliage while perched and also while briefly hovering after a sally. It usually forages singly and regularly joins mixed-species feeding flocks to forage from the forest's mid level to its canopy.

=== Breeding ===
Some evidence hints that the wing-barred piprites' breeding season includes May and June, at least in the northern part of its range. The one known nest was a cup of moss on the floor of a tree cavity. Nothing else is known about the species' breeding biology.

=== Vocalization ===
The wing-barred piprites' song is somewhat variable but in general is "a rhythmic, far-carrying sequence, e.g. 'whip, pip-pip, pidipip, whip' ". It has also been written as "quee, quee quee queedle-le quee, quee?".

== Status ==
The IUCN has assessed the wing-barred piprites as being of Least Concern. It has an extremely large range; its population size is not known and is believed to be decreasing. No immediate threats have been identified. It is considered uncommon to fairly common in general (though often local) and "rather uncommon" in Colombia. It occurs in several protected areas.
