= Petra Rudolf =

German and Italian physicist

- Born: 1957 (age 68–69); Munich, West Germany (now Germany)
- Citizenship: Germany, Italy
- Education: PhD in Physics (1995), Facultés Universitaires Notre-Dame de la Paix
- Alma mater: University of Namur
- Spouse: Valerio Cugia di Sant'Orsola
- Scientific career
- Fields: Experimental solid state physics, surface science, nanoscience, x-ray photoelectron spectroscopy, organic thin films, molecular switches and motors
- Workplaces: University of Groningen, Groningen, Netherlands
- Thesis: "Structural, vibrational and electronic properties of ultrathin C60 films on metallic substrates" (1995)
- Doctoral advisor: Roland Caudano
- Website: www.rug.nl/staff/p.rudolf/

Petra Rudolf (born 1957) is a German and Italian solid state physicist. As of 2003, Rudolf has been a professor at the Materials Science Centre (now Zernike Institute for Advanced Materials), University of Groningen, Netherlands.

== Biography ==
Born in Munich, Rudolf moved to Italy to complete high school and to receive her MSc degree (magna cum laude) in physics at the Sapienza University of Rome, Italy. Following, she worked at the National Surface Science Laboratory in Trieste for five years, interrupted two times to work on the newly discovered fullerenes at Bell Labs, USA. In 1995, she received her PhD (magna cum laude) in physics under the supervision of Roland Caudano at Facultés Universitaires Notre-Dame de la Paix, Namur, Belgium. After several research positions in Namur, she became professor in Experimental Solid State Physics at the University of Groningen in 2003.

In addition to her research, Rudolf also has been active in spreading knowledge on how unconscious biases impact careers in science, and how to mitigate that influence through advocating positive action programs. Efforts by Rudolf have been pivotal in supporting the Rosalind Franklin Fellowship program at University of Groningen, which was installed by then Dean Douwe Wiersma in 2002 and recognized by the 2018 Diversity Award from The Netherlands Physics Association.

Rudolf has been elected to offices in professional organizations. She was President of the Belgian Physical Society from 2000 to 2001 and President of the European Physical Society from 2019 to 2020. She is currently the chair of the EPS Equal Opportunities Committee.

== Research ==
Petra Rudolf's research focuses on surface physics of organic thin films, molecular motors, nanocomposites, as well as 2D materials, to gain a better understanding of the physical phenomena that they display and for potential technological innovations.

Rudolf's expertise has been on the application of various surface sensitive spectroscopic measurement techniques (x-ray and ultraviolet photoemission spectroscopy, electron energy loss spectroscopy, angle-resolved photoemission spectroscopy, Auger electron spectroscopy, inverse photoemission spectroscopy, X-ray absorption spectroscopy, as well as low energy- and time-resolved electron diffraction) to study the various materials systems.

While these techniques have been used by Rudolf and her group to study a wide variety of materials, Rudolf has contributed to work with graphene-based materials and, more recently, 2D materials. Graphene-based materials have and can contribute to significant developments in the electronics industry, and Rudolf's lab has been able to find better ways to produce 2D materials.

More recently, Rudolf has also been devoted to developing pillared graphene materials for spintronics and hydrogen storage applications. Her interests span much further than carbon-based materials however, with recent successes with germanane-based and other materials which show promising devices and catalysis applications.

As of 2019, Rudolf's work on synthetic molecular switches and molecular machines for the production of functional surfaces, in collaboration with colleagues, such as Ben Feringa, is also ongoing.

== Awards and honours ==
Petra Rudolf is a Fellow of the American Physical Society, awarded "for explorations of fullerenes, nanotubes, graphite, and graphene, as well as light-driven synthetic molecular motors". She is also a Fellow of the Institute of Physics and an honorary member of the Italian and the Dutch Physical Society.

In 2007, Rudolf and her research group was one of the winners of the EU Descartes Prize for their work on molecular machines, as part of the SynNanoMotor consortium, a collaborative partnership of researchers from countries including France, Italy and Scotland. This work was pivotal in building early synthetic nanomachines.

In 2013, Rudolf received the royal decoration and was appointed Officer of the Order of Orange-Nassau.

In 2016 Rudolf was elected Member of the German National Academy of Science and Engineering (acatech). She was elected to the Academia Europaea in 2021.
