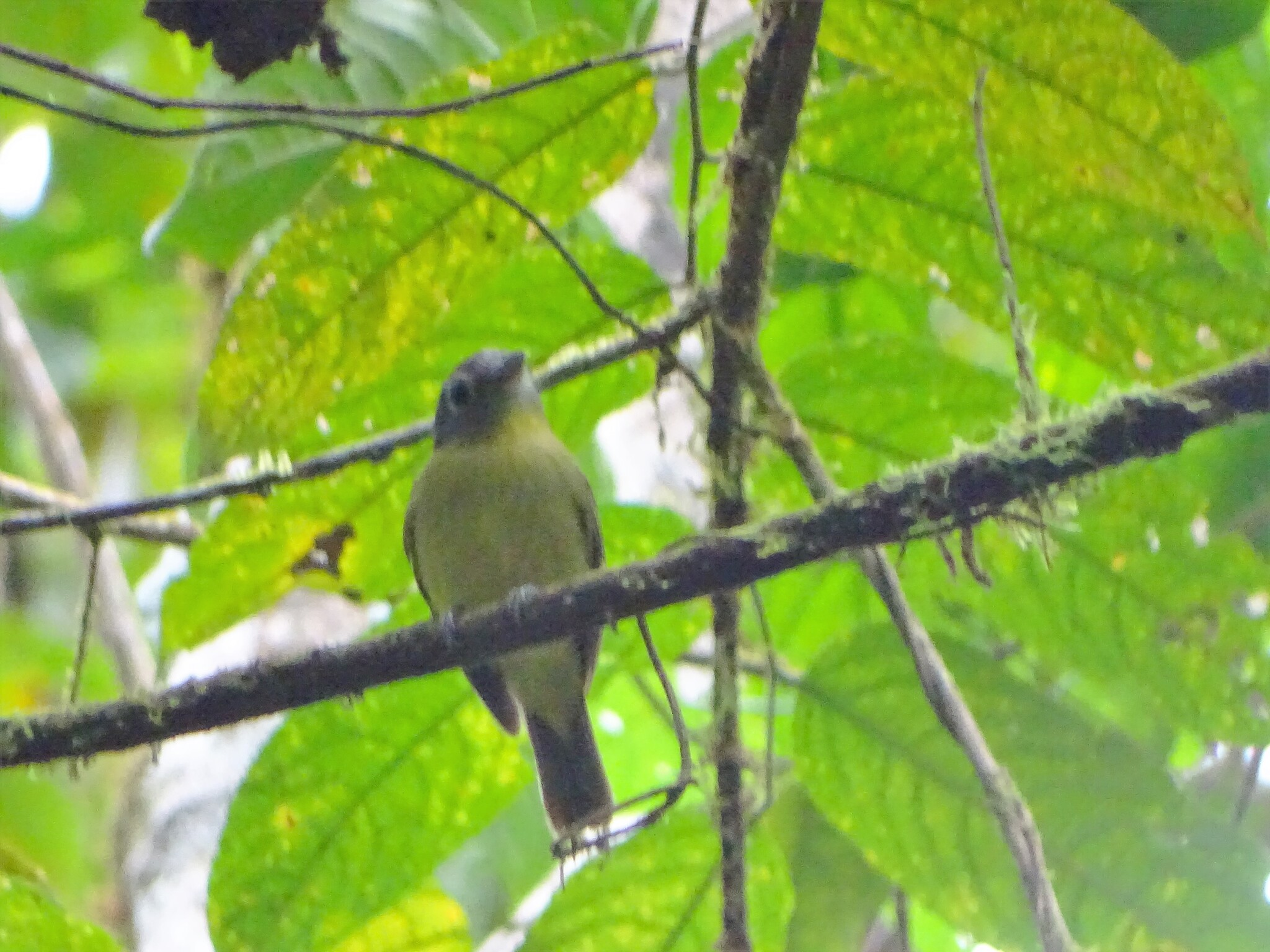
- In Iriona, Colon, Honduras

Conservation status
- Least Concern (IUCN 3.1)

Scientific classification
- Kingdom: Animalia
- Phylum: Chordata
- Class: Aves
- Order: Passeriformes
- Family: Tyrannidae
- Genus: Piprites
- Species: P. griseiceps

Binomial name
- Piprites griseiceps Salvin, 1865

= Grey-headed piprites =

Species of bird

The grey-headed piprites (Piprites griseiceps) is a species of bird in subfamily Pipritinae of family Tyrannidae, the tyrant flycatchers. It is found in Costa Rica, Guatemala, Honduras, Nicaragua, and Panama. Prior to genetic studies in 2009, it was placed in the family Pipritinae with the manakins.

== Taxonomy and systematics ==
The grey-headed piprites is monotypic. It shares genus Piprites with the wing-barred piprites (P. chloris) and the black-capped piprites (P. pileata). The grey-headed and wing-barred piprites form a superspecies. Genetically, it is particularly close to the wing-barred piprites.

== Description ==
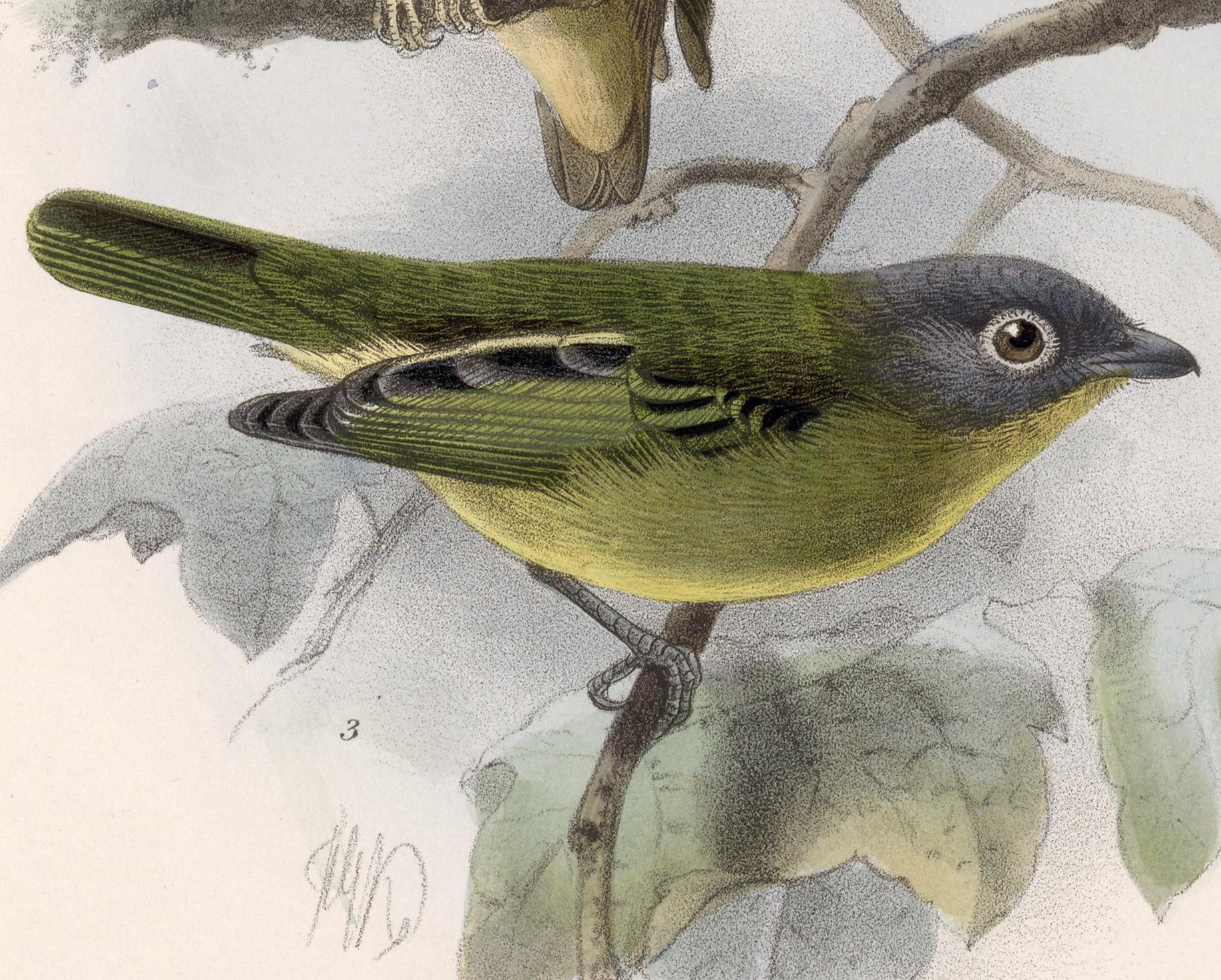
Illustration by John Gerrard Keulemans, 1902

The grey-headed piprites is 12 to 13 cm (4.7 to 5.1 in) long and weighs about 16 g (0.56 oz). It is considered as having an especially long tail among similar species. The sexes have the same plumage. Adults have a slate-gray head with a bold white eyering. Their upperparts, wings, and tail are olive-green with yellow-green edges on their flight feathers. Their underparts are yellowish olive that is lightest on their throat and belly. They have a dark iris, a blackish maxilla, a paler mandible, and gray legs and feet.

== Distribution and habitat ==
The grey-headed piprites is found on the Caribbean slope of Central America from far eastern Guatemala through Honduras, Nicaragua, and Costa Rica to Bocas del Toro Province in far western Panama. It inhabits wet primary forest and mature secondary forest. In elevation it mostly occurs from sea level to 750 m (2,500 ft) though it reaches 1,100 m (3,600 ft) in Honduras and 900 m (3,000 ft) in Costa Rica.

== Behavior ==
=== Movement ===
The grey-headed piprites is a year-round resident throughout its range.

=== Feeding ===
The grey-headed piprites forages mostly in the forest's middle level. It feeds on small fruits and insects that it takes with a sally from a perch. It often joins mixed-species feeding flocks.

=== Breeding ===
Nothing is known about the grey-headed piprites' breeding biology.

=== Vocalization ===
The grey-headed piprites' song is "an undulating two-second phrase of quick, sputtering notes". One call is "a liquid whit!". Another is "a soft, liquid, rolling 'purrr'".

== Status ==
The IUCN has assessed the grey-headed piprites as being of Least Concern. It has a large range; its population size is not known and is believed to be decreasing. No immediate threats have been identified. It is overall considered uncommon to rare, and there are especially few records of it in the northernmost and southernmost reaches of its range, with only one sighting in Guatemala. It has been noted in Honduras and Costa Rica, and it occurs in two protected areas in Costa Rica.
