= Davita Watkins =

American chemist

Davita L. Watkins
- Education: Vanderbilt University, University of Memphis
- Awards: National Science Foundation CAREER Award, American Chemical Society Young Investigator Award, ORAU Ralph E. Powe Junior Faculty Enhancement Award
- Scientific career
- Fields: Organic chemistry, functional materials, supramolecular chemistry
- Workplaces: University of Florida, University of Mississippi
- Thesis: Novel Photochromic Spirooxazine Dimers: Synthesis, Characterization, and Applications (2012)
- Doctoral advisor: Tomoko Fujiwara
- Website: https://www.watkinsresearchgroup.org/

Davita L. Watkins is an associate professor of chemistry at The Ohio State University, where her research interest is in developing supramolecular synthesis methods to make new organic semiconducting materials for applications in optoelectronic devices, as well as studying their structural, optical, and electronic properties. Her group also investigates the design of dendrimer molecules for biomedical applications.

== Education ==
Watkins obtained a bachelor's degree in chemistry and anthropology from Vanderbilt University in 2006 and her Ph.D. from the University of Memphis in 2012. Her doctoral research under the supervision of Tomoko Fujiwara was focused on establishing new synthetic routes for a series of oligomers and studying their photochromic and solvatochromic properties.

== Research and career ==
Watkins began her postdoctoral research at the University of Florida in 2012, developing new organic materials for applications in photovoltaics. In particular, she worked on oligomers that could be synthesised via self-assembly techniques and studying their optoelectronic and redox properties.

She joined University of Mississippi in 2014 as an assistant professor, the first female tenure track professor in the department of chemistry and biochemistry. As of 2022, she is an associate professor of chemistry with a joint appointment in the department of chemical and biomolecular engineering at The Ohio State University. Her research in supramolecular chemistry specialises in designing new synthetic routes for making oligomer semiconductors for applications in optoelectronic devices by studying the relationships between their structural, optical and electronic properties. Her group is also interested in the synthesis of new dendrimer molecules for applications in drug delivery, theranostics, and biomedicine. The American Chemical Society highlighted her work with profiles and interviews.

== Awards and honours ==
- American Chemical Society Rising Star Award, 2020
- American Chemical Society Young Investigator Award, 2018
- NOBCChE Lloyd N Ferguson Young Scientist Award for Excellence in Research, 2018
- Journal of Materials Chemistry C Emerging Investigator, 2018
- University of Mississippi Mike L. Edmons New Scholar Award 2018
- National Science Foundation CAREER Award, 2017
- Oak Ridge Associated Universities Ralph E. Powe Junior Faculty Enhancement Award, 2015
