= Laurent Cesalli =

Swiss historian of philosophy

Laurent Cesalli (born 1968) is a Swiss historian of philosophy who focuses on philosophy of language, philosophy of mind and metaphysics.

== Life ==
Laurent Cesalli was born in Vevey in 1968. After graduating from high school in 1987, he studied at the University of Fribourg and graduated in 1993 under the supervision of Ruedi Imbach. Upon graduation he focused on non-academic activities: in 1995–1996, he cycled from Geneva to Beijing and, in 1997, he became a mountain guide. In 1998, he began his Ph.D. in medieval philosophy at the University of Geneva under the supervision of Alain de Libera, completing it in 2003. From 2004 to 2008 he worked as Wissenschaftlicher Assistent at the Albert-Ludwigs-Universität in Freiburg i. Br. From 2008 to 2014 he has been teaching at the universities of Lausanne, Freiburg, Geneva, Fribourg, and Cornell University. From 2011 to 2014 he was a researcher at the Centre national de la recherche scientifique in Lille (UMR 8163, Savoirs, textes, langage). Since 2014 he is full professor of medieval philosophy at the University of Geneva. Since 2018 he is editor-in-chief of the Grundriss der Geschichte der Philosophie|de (Ueberweg), together with Gerald Hartung (Wuppertal).

== Areas of specialization ==
His research focuses on philosophy of language, philosophy of mind and metaphysics – both in the Middle Ages and within the so-called “Austro-German” tradition (Brentano and his pupils).

== Selected publications ==
- ‘Grammaire, logique et psychologie chez Anton Marty’, Bulletin d’analyse phénoménologique 12 (2016), 121-138 (available here).
- ‘Propositions. Their Meaning and their Truth’, in C. Dutilh Novaes & S. Read (eds.), The Cambridge Companion to Medieval Logic, Cambridge: Cambridge University Press, 2015, p. 245-264.
- Universals in the 14th Century (editor with Fabrizio Amerini), Pisa: Edizioni della Normale, 2017.
- ‘Meaning and Truth’, in A. Conti (ed.), A Companion to Walter Burley. A Late Medieval Logician and Metaphysician, Leiden: Brill (2013), p. 87-133.
- ‘Meaning in Action. Anton Marty’s Pragmatic Semantics’, in M. Cameron & R. Stainton (eds.), Linguistic Content. New Essays on the History of Philosophy of Language, Oxford: Oxford University Press, 2015, p. 245-265.
- ‘States of Affairs’, in J. Marenbon (ed.), The Oxford Handbook of Medieval Philosophy, Oxford: Oxford University Press, 2012, p. 421-444.
- ‘Medieval Logic as Sprachphilosophie’, Bulletin de philosophie médiévale 52 (2010), p. 117-132.
- Le réalisme propositionnel. Sémantique et ontologie des propositions chez Jean Duns Scot, Gauthier Burley, Richard Brinkley et Jean Wyclif, Paris: Vrin, 2007.
