= Novaes =

Novaes is a surname. Notable people with the surname include:

- Catarina Dutilh Novaes (born 1976), Brazilian-Dutch philosopher
- Gabriel Novaes (born 1999), Brazilian footballer
- Guiomar Novaes (1895–1979), Brazilian pianist
- Luciana Novaes (1983–2026), Brazilian social worker and politician
- Magno Novaes (born 1983), Brazilian footballer
- Marcelino Novaes (born 1967), Brazilian boxer
- Marcello Novaes (born 1962), Brazilian actor
- Nathalia Novaes (fl. early 21st century), Brazilian model
- Tiago Novaes (born 1979), Brazilian writer
- Waldyr Calheiros Novaes (1923–2013), Brazilian Roman Catholic bishop
