= Maria Antonietta Loi =

Italian physicist

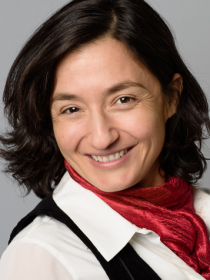
- Born: May 4, 1973 (age 53); Quartu Sant'Elena
- Education: University of Cagliari
- Scientific career
- Workplaces: Italian National Research Council; Johannes Kepler University Linz

Maria Antonietta Loi (born 4 May 1973) is an Italian physicist who is a Professor of Optoelectronics at the University of Groningen and member of the Zernike Institute for Advanced Materials. Her research considers the development of functional materials for low-cost, high efficiency optoelectronic device. She was awarded the 2018 Netherlands Physical Society Physics prize (Physicaprijs). In 2020, she was elected Fellow of the American Physical Society. In 2022 she became a member of the Royal Netherlands Academy of Arts and Sciences (KNAW) and of the European academy of Science (EurASc). Loi is Editor-in-chief of Applied Physics Letters.

== Early life and education ==
Loi was born in Quartu Sant'Elena, Sardinia. She studied physics at the University of Cagliari. She was awarded honours for her undergraduate degree in 1997, before embarking upon a doctoral research program. After earning her PhD she moved to the Johannes Kepler University Linz, where she worked as a postdoctoral researcher on organic solar cells. After one year in Austria she returned to Italy, where she joined the Italian National Research Council Institute for Nanostructured Materials.

== Research and career ==
In 2006, Loi was appointed Assistant Professor at the University of Groningen, and awarded a Rosalind Franklin Fellowship. Her early work considered the investigation of organic semiconductors and carbon nanotubes photophysical and optoelectronic properties. She was made Chair of the Department of Photophyics and OptoElectronics in 2011, and Full Professor in 2014.

Loi's research considers the development of solution processable semiconductors and hybrid nanomaterials. In particular, she has explored perovskites for solar cells and X-ray detectors. She has shown that Sn-based perovskites have intriguing physical properties such as showing photoluminescence from hot-carriers with long lifetimes.

== Awards and honours ==
- 2011 Minerva Prize
- 2013 European Research Council Starting Grant
- 2013 Elected to AcademiaNet
- 2018 Physica Prize
- 2020 Elected Fellow of the American Physical Society
- 2022 European Research Council Advanced Grant
- 2022 Elected Member of the Royal Netherlands Academy of Arts and Sciences
- 2022 Elected Fellow of the Royal Society of Chemistry
- 2022 Elected Fellow of the European Academy of Sciences

== Selected publications ==
- Haotong Wei; Yanjun Fang; Padhraic Mulligan; et al. (21 March 2016). "Sensitive X-ray detectors made of methylammonium lead tribromide perovskite single crystals". Nature Photonics. 10 (5): 333–339. doi:10.1038/nphoton.2016.41. ISSN 1749-4885. Wikidata Q60670575.
- Shuyan Shao; Jian Liu; Giuseppe Portale; Hong-Hua Fang; Graeme R. Blake; Gert H. ten Brink; L. Jan Anton Koster; Maria Antonietta Loi (22 September 2017). "Highly Reproducible Sn-Based Hybrid Perovskite Solar Cells with 9% Efficiency". Advanced Energy Materials. 8 (4) 1702019. doi:10.1002/aenm.201702019. ISSN 1614-6832. Wikidata Q60670424.
- Markus C Scharber; Markus Koppe; Jia Gao; et al. (1 January 2010). "Influence of the bridging atom on the performance of a low-bandgap bulk heterojunction solar cell". Advanced Materials. 22 (3): 367–370. doi:10.1002/adma.200900529. ISSN 0935-9648. PMID 20217720. Wikidata Q60671035.
