= Juan Bisquert =

Spanish researcher

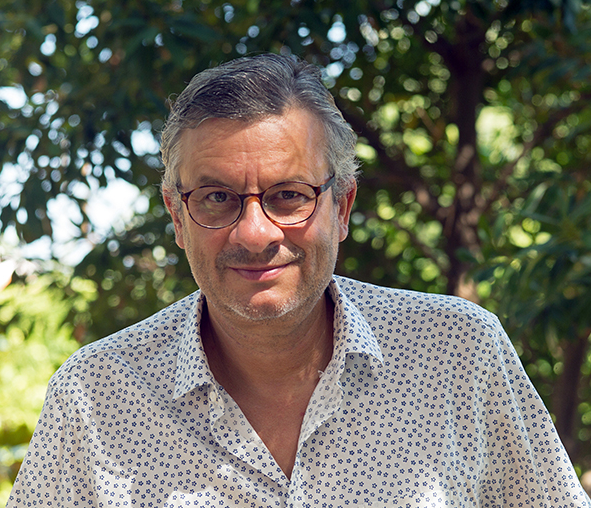
- Juan Bisquert in 2023
- Born: November 21, 1962 (age 63); Düsseldorf, Germany
- Occupation: Physicist
- Website: profund.itq.webs.upv.es

Juan Bisquert (Düsseldorf, 21 November 1962), is a Spanish physicist recognized for his research in solar energy conversion and functional electronic devices. His work has significantly contributed to the development of perovskite solar cells and neuromorphic devices based on materials with memory properties, with applications in bioinspired computing. He was the founder and director (2015–2020) of the Institute of Advanced Materials (INAM) at the Universitat Jaume I, and since 2017 he has presided over the Fundació Scito (Valencia). He is currently Distinguished Researcher at the Instituto de Tecnología Química (ITQ) a joint center of the CSIC and the UPV

== Biography ==
Juan Bisquert was born in Düsseldorf (Germany) and grew up in Dénia, in the Valencian Community. He earned a degree in physics from the Universitat de València, where he obtained his PhD in 1991 with a dissertation on donor–acceptor type semiconducting polymers.

He began his academic career at the University of Castilla-La Mancha, on the Albacete campus, where he taught from 1987 to 1991. That same year, he joined the Universitat Jaume I in Castelló de la Plana, where he developed a long-standing teaching and research trajectory, first as associate professor and later as full professor of applied physics. At this university, he founded and directed the Institute of Advanced Materials (INAM) between 2015 and 2020.

In 2024, he was appointed Distinguished Researcher at the Instituto de Tecnología Química (ITQ), a joint center of the CSIC and the UPV, where he currently leads the research group PROFUND (Processing Functional Ionic-Electronic Devices), focused on the development of functional materials for renewable energy and artificial intelligence, with an emphasis on photoactive and memristive devices with ionic–electronic coupling.

Since 2017, he has chaired the Fundació Scito, an entity dedicated to the promotion of scientific and technological knowledge, through which he leads the international scientific conference platform nanoGe.

== Research activity ==
Juan Bisquert has conducted extensive research in the field of solar energy conversion, functional materials, and electronic devices with dynamic response. At the Universitat Jaume I, he served as director of the Institute of Advanced Materials (INAM), where he led studies on materials, nanostructures, and devices for the production of clean energy, with a particular focus on technologies such as perovskite solar cells.

Among his most notable contributions is the application of the concept of quantum capacitance (also referred to as chemical capacitance) in nanostructured conductive devices, as well as the analysis of inductive and capacitive hysteresis phenomena in photoactive systems. These approaches have been essential to understanding the electrical dynamics and memory effects in solar cells and memristors.

Bisquert has published more than 400 scientific articles in indexed international journals and has been cited over 40,000 times. Since 2014, he has been continuously included in the list of Highly Cited Researchers by Clarivate Analytics.

He is the European editor of the journal Journal of Physical Chemistry Letters, published by the American Chemical Society, and has served on the editorial boards of journals such as ChemElectroChem and Journal of Environmental Science and Sustainable Energy.

He is the author of the book The Physics of Solar Energy Conversion, which integrates his research on the physico-chemical principles of energy conversion technologies, with particular attention to solar cells and functional materials.

In recent years, his research has focused on the development of memristive and neuromorphic devices for bioinspired computing, integrating memory, learning, and signal processing functionalities. This line of work is part of the European project PeroSpiker, funded by the ERC, in which he serves as principal investigator. The project explores spiking network architectures using devices based on perovskites.

His group investigates devices that combine ionic and electronic conduction, such as memristors and hybrid transistors, with complex dynamic responses—including hysteresis, bifurcations, and adaptive behavior—that enable the emulation of artificial neuron functions in bioinspired circuits. One of the models developed, CALM (Conductance-Activated Quasi-Linear Memristor), describes the gradual activation of conductance through coupled electronic and ionic transitions.

This approach has been presented in scientific publications and international conferences such as Neuronics25, featuring research on the dynamic properties of neuromorphic memristors and oscillators, impedance spectroscopy, and Hopf-type bifurcations applied to the modeling of artificial neurons.
