= Quantum capacitance =

Type of capacitance

Quantum capacitance, also known as chemical capacitance is defined as the variation of electrical charge $q$ with respect to the variation of internal chemical potential $\mu$, i.e., $C_{q} = \frac{dq}{d\mu}$. It was first introduced theoretically by Serge Luryi (1988).

In the simplest example, if a parallel-plate capacitor is made so that one or both of the plates has a low density of states, then the capacitance is not given by the normal formula for parallel-plate capacitors, $C_e$. Instead, the capacitance is lower, as if there was another capacitor in series, $C_q$. This second capacitance, related to the density of states of the plates, is the quantum capacitance and is represented by $C_q$. The combination of regular geometric capacitance with chemical/quantum capacitance is called electrochemical capacitance $\frac{1}{C_{\bar{\mu}}} = \frac{1}{C_e} + \frac{1}{C_q}$.

Quantum capacitance is especially important for low-density-of-states systems, such as a 2-dimensional electronic system in a semiconductor surface or interface or graphene, and can be used to construct an experimental energy functional of electron density.

== Overview ==
When a voltmeter is used to measure an electronic device, it does not quite measure the pure electric potential (also called Galvani potential). Instead, it measures the electrochemical potential, also called "fermi level difference", which is the total free energy difference per electron, including not only its electric potential energy but also all other forces and influences on the electron (such as the kinetic energy in its wavefunction). For example, a p–n junction in equilibrium, there is a galvani potential (built-in potential) across the junction, but the "voltage" across it is zero (in the sense that a voltmeter would measure zero voltage).

In a capacitor, there is a relation between charge and voltage, $Q=CV$. As explained above, we can divide the voltage into two pieces: The galvani potential, and everything else.

In a traditional metal-insulator-metal capacitor, the galvani potential is the only relevant contribution. Therefore, the capacitance can be calculated in a straightforward way using Gauss's law.

However, if one or both of the capacitor plates is a semiconductor, then galvani potential is not necessarily the only important contribution to capacitance. As the capacitor charge increases, the negative plate fills up with electrons, which occupy higher-energy states in the band structure, while the positive plate loses electrons, leaving behind electrons with lower-energy states in the band structure. Therefore, as the capacitor charges or discharges, the voltage changes at a different rate than the galvani potential difference.

In these situations, one cannot calculate capacitance merely by looking at the overall geometry and using Gauss's law. One must also take into account the band-filling / band-emptying effect, related to the density-of-states of the plates. The band-filling / band-emptying effect alters the capacitance, imitating a second capacitance in series. This capacitance is called quantum capacitance, because it is related to the energy of an electron's quantum wavefunction.

Some scientists refer to this same concept as chemical capacitance, because it is related to the electrons' chemical potential.

The ideas behind quantum capacitance are closely linked to Thomas–Fermi screening and band bending.

== Theory ==
Take a capacitor where one side is a metal with essentially-infinite density of states. The other side is the low density-of-states material, e.g. a 2DEG, with density of states $\rho$. The geometrical capacitance (i.e., the capacitance if the 2DEG were replaced by a metal, due to galvani potential alone) is $C_\text{geom}$.

Now suppose that N electrons (a charge of $Q=N e$) are moved from the metal to the low-density-of-states material. The Galvani potential changes by $\Delta V_\text{galvani} = Q/C_\text{geom}$. Additionally, the internal chemical potential of electrons in the 2DEG changes by $\Delta \mu_\text{internal} = N/\rho = Q/(\rho e)$, which is equivalent to a voltage change of $\Delta V_\text{quantum} = (\Delta \mu_\text{internal}) / e = Q/(\rho e^2)$.

The total voltage change is the sum of these two contributions. Therefore, the total effect is as if there are two capacitances in series: The conventional geometry-related capacitance (as calculated by Gauss's law), and the "quantum capacitance" related to the density of states. The latter is:

$C_\text{quantum} = \rho e^2$

In the case of an ordinary 2DEG with parabolic dispersion,

$$C_\text{quantum} = \frac{g_v m^* e^2}{\pi \hbar^2}$$

where $g_v$ is the valley degeneracy factor, and m* is effective mass.

== Applications ==
The quantum capacitance of graphene is relevant to understanding and modeling gated graphene. It is also relevant for carbon nanotubes.

In modeling and analyzing dye-sensitized solar cells, the quantum capacitance of the sintered TiO_{2} nanoparticle electrode is an important effect, as described in the work of Juan Bisquert.

Luryi proposed a variety of devices using 2DEGs, which only work because of the low 2DEG density-of-states, and its associated quantum capacitance effect. For example, in the three-plate configuration metal-insulator-2DEG-insulator-metal, the quantum capacitance effect means that the two capacitors interact with each other.

Quantum capacitance can be relevant in capacitance–voltage profiling.

When supercapacitors are analyzed in detail, quantum capacitance plays an important role.
