= Rosalind Franklin Fellowship =

The Rosalind Franklin Fellowship (RFF) is an initiation of University of Groningen, the Netherlands. It is named in honor of Rosalind Franklin. The purpose of the RFF program is to promote the advancement of talented international researchers at the highest levels of the institution.

== History ==
The program is co-funded by the European Union and primarily directed at female academics, who have a PhD and substantial post-graduation work experience, and who aim for a career towards full professorship at a European top research university. The 5-year fellowship is given to female academics with outstanding track record, including high-quality publications, external funding, and leadership, and provides the fellow with salary and research funds to start a research group and conduct independent research.

In 2009, Queen Máxima of the Netherlands joined the Fellowship Ceremony. The RFF program, since its initiation in 2003 and as of 2019, has successfully supported more than 80 female academics, who now constitute more than 10% of the female professors of the university.

== Fellows ==
- 2019–2020
  - Sandy Schmidt, Science and Engineering
  - Hannah Dugdale, Science and Engineering
  - Julia Kamenz, Science and Engineering
  - Inge Holtman, Medical Sciences
  - Hilde Bras, Arts
  - Sumaya Albalooshi, Economics and Business
  - Mònica Colominas Aparicio, Theology and Religious Studies
  - Valentina Gallo, Campus Fryslân
  - Zoé Christoff, Science and Engineering
  - Helle Hansen, Science and Engineering
  - Renata Raidou, Science and Engineering
  - Kasia Tych, Science and Engineering
  - Jagoda Slawinska, Science and Engineering
  - Jingxiu Xie, Science and Engineering
  - Elisabeth Wilhelm, Science and Engineering
  - Lisa Herzog, Philosophy
  - Ema Dimastrogiovanni, Science and Engineering
  - Cecília Salgado Guimarães da Silva, Science and Engineering
  - Annette Bergemann, Economics and Business
  - Tessa Quax, Science and Engineering
- 2017–2018
  - Sofia Fernandes Da Silva Ranchordás, Law
  - Lingyu Wang, Science and Engineering
  - Manuela Vecchi, KVI- Cart
  - Milena Nikolova, Economics and Business
  - Antje Schmitt, Behavioural and Social Sciences
  - Jessica de Bloom, Economics and Business
  - Başak Bilecen, Behavioural and Social Sciences
  - Rieneke Slager, Economics and Business
- 2015–2016
  - Su Lam, UMCG (Experimental Cardiology)
  - Judith Daniels, Social Sciences (Psychology)
  - Janette Burgess, UMCG (Cell Biology)
  - Iris Jonkers, UMCG (Genetics)
  - Marit Westerterp, UMCG
  - Miriam Kunz, UMCG (Geriatrics)
  - Judith Paridaen, UMCG (Ageing Biology)
  - Lucy Avraamidou, Science and Engineering
  - Kerstin Bunte, Science and Engineering
  - Julia Even, Science and Engineering
  - Pratika Dayal, Science and Engineering (Astronomy)
  - Amalia Dolga, Science and Engineering (Molecular Pharmacology)
  - Anastasia Borschevsky, Science and Engineering
  - Marthe Walvoort, Science and Engineering (Chemical Biology)
  - Jing Wan, Economics and Business (Marketing)
- 2013–2014
  - Dorina Buda (FRW, Tourism)
  - Susanne Tauber (FEB, HRM&OB)
  - Raquel Ortega Argilés (FEB, GR&M)
  - Martine Maan (FSE, CBN)
  - Ykelien Boersma (FSE, GRIP)
  - Anna Salvati (FSE, GRIP)
  - Mónica López López (GMW, Orthopedagogy)
  - Stefania Travagnin (GGW, Religious Studies)
  - Brigit Toebes (Law, Constitutional Law and International Law)
  - Merel Keijzer (Let, Applied Linguistics)
  - Romana Schirhagl (UMCG, Biomedical Engineering)
  - Sophia Bruggeman (UMCG, Paediatrics)
  - Maaike Oosterveer (UMCG, Paediatrics)
  - Sonja Pyott (UMCG, ENT)
- 2011–2012
  - Karina Isabel Caputi (FSE, Sterrenkunde)
  - Angela Casini (FSE, Medicinale Anorganische Chemie)
  - Jennifer Jordan (FEB, HRM & OB)
  - Jia Liu (FEB, Marketing)
  - Alexandra Zhernakova (UMCG, Genetics)
  - Pascale Francis Dijkers (UMCG, Cell Biology)
  - Kathrin Thedieck (UMCG)
  - Maria Colomé Tatché (UMCG)
  - Olha Cherednychenko (Law, Private Law)
  - Caroline Fournet (Law, Criminal Law)
  - Catarina Dutilh Novaes (FWB, Theoretical Philosophy)
  - Tamara Witschge (Let, Journalism)
  - Lidewijde de Jong (Let, Archeology)
  - Joanne van der Woude (Let, English)
  - Aleksandra Biegun (KVI, Proton Therapy)
- 2009–2010
  - Bregje Wertheim (FSE, Biology)
  - Anke Terwisscha van Scheltinga (FSE)
  - Tamalika Banerjee (FSE, Physics)
  - Sabrina Corbellini (LET, Dutch Literature)
  - Monika Baár (LET, History)
  - Carolina Armenteros (LET, History)
  - Dineke Verbeek (UMCG, Neurology)
  - Ingrid Nijholt (UMCG, Neuroscience)
  - Barbara Bakker (UMCG, Biochemistry)
  - Nicoletta Kahya (UMCG, Cellbiology)
  - Deniz Başkent (UMCG, Biophysics)
  - Barbara Van Leeuwen (UMCG, Chirurgische Oncologie)
  - Joke Spikman (UMCG/GMW, Neuropsychologie)
  - Jeanne Mifsud Bonnici (Law)
  - Hinke Haisma (FRW)
  - Mirjam Dür (FSE, Mathematics)
  - Sonja Smets (FSE, Artificial Intelligence and FWB, Theoretical Philosophy)
- 2007
  - Maria Antonietta Loi (FSE, Physics)
  - Martina Schmidt (FSE, Pharmacy)
  - Irene Tieleman (FSE, Biology)
  - Laura Spierdijk (FEB)
  - Monika Schmid (LET), Engels
  - Marie-Christine Opdenakker (GMW, Educational Science)
  - Floor Rink (FEB, Organizational Psychology)
  - Ute Bültmann (UMCG, Psychische Gezondheid en arbeidsparticipatie)
  - Marianne Rots (UMCG, Pathologie en Laboratoriumgeneeskunde)
  - Jetta Bijlsma (UMCG, Medical Microbiology)
  - Ellen Nollen (UMCG, Genetics)
  - Eriko Takano (FSE, Microbial Physiology)
- 2003
  - Beatriz Noheda (FSE, Physics)
  - Elisabetta Pallante (FSE, Physics)
  - Charlotte Hemelrijk (FSE, Biology)
