= Belgian Physical Society =

Scientific society in Belgium

- Abbreviation: BPS
- Formation: 16 February 1929; 97 years ago
- Type: Scientific
- Purpose: Promote physics and physicists in Belgium
- Headquarters: Ringlaan/Avenue Circulaire, 3 – B-1180 Ukkel/Uccle, Belgium
- Location: Belgium
- President: Dr Jozef Ongena
- Website: www.belgianphysicalsociety.be

The Belgian Physical Society (BPS) (Dutch: Belgische Natuurkundige Vereniging and French: Société Belge de Physique) is the national physical society of Belgium, member of the European Physical Society. As a national scientific charity, its goal is to promote physics, advance physics education & research and support physicists in Belgium.

== History ==
The Belgian Physical Society was founded on 16 February 1929 at the University Foundation, following an initiative of the national committee of physics. Its first president was the spectroscopist A. de Hemptinne, and the first vice-president was Th. De Donder, who contributed i.e., to the field of general relativity. The early archives of the society were lost during the Second World War, when its activities were suspended. The rebirth of the BPS took place in 1949 under the presidency of Charles Manneback, and on 26 December 1962, the BPS became an association without lucrative purpose. In 1950, the society created its first journal, the Bulletin of the Belgian Physical Society. This publication was succeeded by Physicalia in 1964, and by BPhy-Magazine (an electronic journal) in 2009. In 1970, under the presidency of Lieven Van Gerven, the society started its series of "general scientific meetings" which bring together physicists from all Belgian universities and research institutes, and of all physics disciplines.

== Conferences ==
One of the main activities of the BPS is organizing international conferences such as the annual BPS general meeting. The conference location cycles between the ten different universities that offer physics programmes in Belgium, and is still organised yearly.

== Prizes ==
Every year BPS awards several prizes to promising young physicists such as the BPS Young Speaker Contest, the BPS Poster Contest and the BPS Best Master Thesis Prize.

== Publications ==
Its electronic magazine is BPhy-Magazine (since 2009), the successor of its former letters journal, Physicalia Magazine.

== Presidents ==
List of presidents of the BPS:

- 2014–present: Jozef Ongena, Royal Military Academy
- 2012–2013: Gilles De Lentdecker, Université Libre de Bruxelles
- 2010–2012: Jacques Tempere, University of Antwerp
- 2008–2009: Luc Henrard, Facultés Universitaires Notre-Dame de la Paix de Namur
- 2006–2007: Patrick Wagner, Hasselt University
- 2004–2005: Viviane Pierrard, Belgian Institute for Space Aeronomy
- 2002–2003: Joseph Octave Indekeu, Katholieke Universiteit Leuven
- 2000–2001: Petra Rudolf, Facultés Universitaires Notre-Dame de la Paix de Namur
- 1998-1999: K. Michel
- 1996-1997: H.-P. Garnier
- 1994-1995: E. Jacobs
- 1991–1993: Guy Demortier, Facultés Universitaires Notre-Dame de la Paix de Namur
- 1990-1991: Yvan Bruynseraede
- 1987–1989: Charles J. Joachain, Université Catholique de Louvain
- 1986-1987: R. Dekeyser
- 1984-1985: Jean-Marie Gilles, Facultés Universitaires Notre-Dame de la Paix de Namur
- 1981-1982: A. De Ruytter
- 1980-1981: R. Ceuleneer
- 1978-1979: Jacques Lemonne, Vrije Universiteit Brussel
- 1976-1977: J. Vervier
- 1974-1975: G. Jacobs
- 1972-1973: J. Depireux
- 1970-1971: Lieven van Gerven, Katholieke Universiteit Leuven
- 1968-1969: J. Franeau
- 1965-1967: W. Dekeyser
- 1960-1964: G. A. Homes
- 1955-1959: P. Swings
- 1949-1954: Charles Manneback, Catholic University of Leuven and Royal Academies for Science and the Arts of Belgium
- 1929-1939: Alexandre de Hemptinne, Catholic University of Leuven
