= Jaume I University =

University in Castellón de la Plana, Spain

- Universitat Jaume I
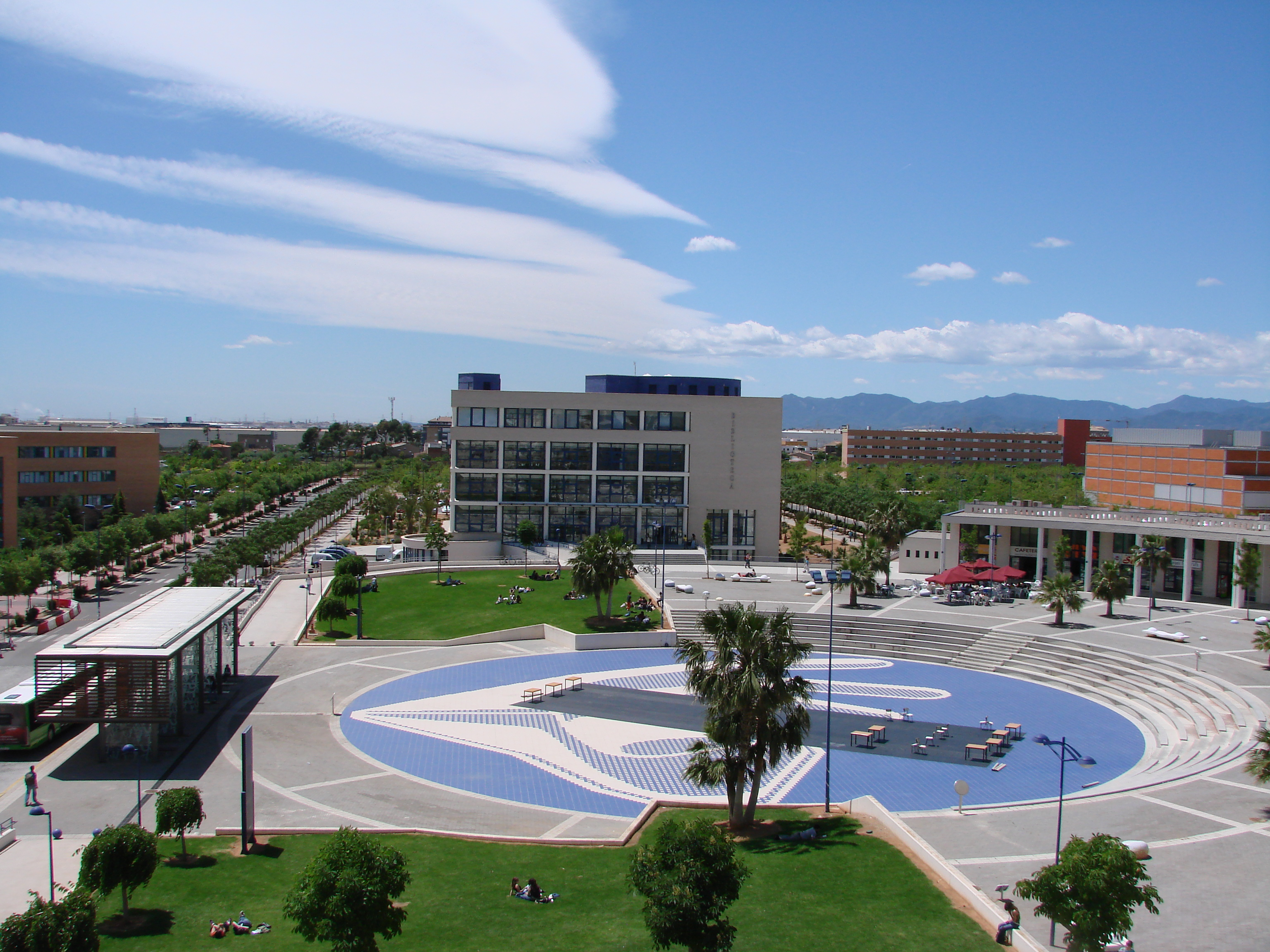
- Agora and Library of Jaume I University
- Established: 1991
- Affiliations: Vives network Compostela Group
- Rector: Jesús Lancis Sáez (2026-2032)
- Students: around 14,000 (in 2021)
- Location: Av. de Vicent Sos Baynat, s/n, Castelló de la Plana, 12071, Spain; 39°59′40″N 0°04′08″W
- Language: Valencian, Spanish, English
- Website: www.uji.es

Jaume I University (Spanish: Universidad Jaime I, Valencian: Universitat Jaume I, UJI; IPA: [univeɾsiˈtad ˈdʒawme pɾiˈmeɾ]) is a university in the city of Castelló de la Plana, Valencian Community, Spain. It was founded in 1991, and it has approximately 14,000 students. The campus, covering 176 000 m^{2}, has 4 faculties and many research and management buildings located around a central 13,000 m^{2} garden, called the Jardí dels Sentits (the garden of the senses).

It is named after James I of Aragon (Jaume I in Valencian), who founded the Kingdom of Valencia.

== International ==
Jaume I University participates in all the international programmes implemented throughout the European Union, such as Erasmus+, Leonardo, Tempus and Alfa, and also those organized by the Spanish government, including the Interuniversity Cooperation Programme. The university is open to new schemes that help enhance the quality of the teaching and the research carried out here. Some of the more noteworthy initiatives related to teaching include the UNESCO Chair on the Philosophy of Peace, the Jean Monnet Chair of Law and European Economics Module, as well as the EURINSA and EURUJI programmes for the training of engineers in Europe.

The university is part of the Xarxa Vives d'Universitats (Vives network), which comprises 21 universities located in Catalan-speaking areas, in four countries (Andorra, France, Italy and Spain).

== Ranking and research ==
University rankings

Global – Overall
- ARWU World: 601–700 (2023)
- THE World: 801–1000 (2024)
- USNWR Global: =984 (2023)

Jaume I University aspires to improve its position in the ranking tables. In the 2021 Shanghai Ranking, it appears among the top 700 universities in the world, making it one of the top 20 of universities in Spain. According to the Times Higher Education World University Rankings, it is among the top 1000 institutions worldwide in 2022, in the top 600 for Impact (2021), and 196th in the Young University Rankings 2021. In the 2021 Web of Universities ranking, Jaume I University comes 21st in Spain and 642nd worldwide.

The area with the strongest research performance is chemistry, in particular the Institute of Advanced Materials, with scientists such as Juan Bisquert (Professor of Applied Physics) and Iván Mora-Seró among the world's most cited researchers in the annual ranking published by Clarivate Analytics.

Despite efforts to improve its international research profile, according to most ranking tables, Jaume I University is not among the world's top 500 universities. One of the reasons is the difficulty to attract top researchers from abroad, or indeed from outside the region, due to stringent linguistic requirements (C1 in the CEFR) in the regional language, Valencian, for all permanent staff.

In 2025, researchers at the university conducted a money-sharing experiment called the Dictator Game. The study found that women are 40% more generous than men and showed that generosity was linked to being open and tolerant, with women who were better at reasoning tended to give less.

== Gallery ==
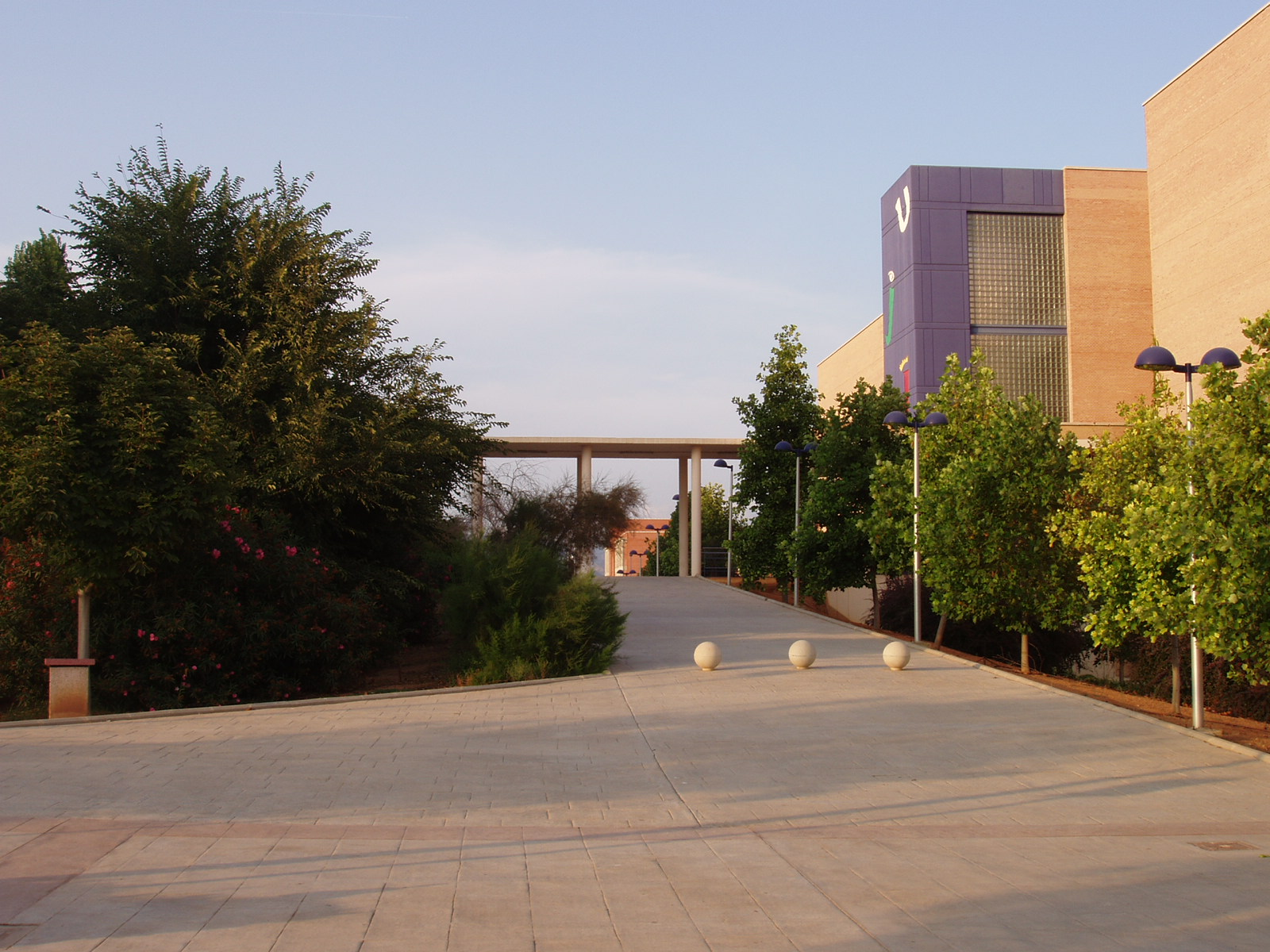
Jaume I University campus

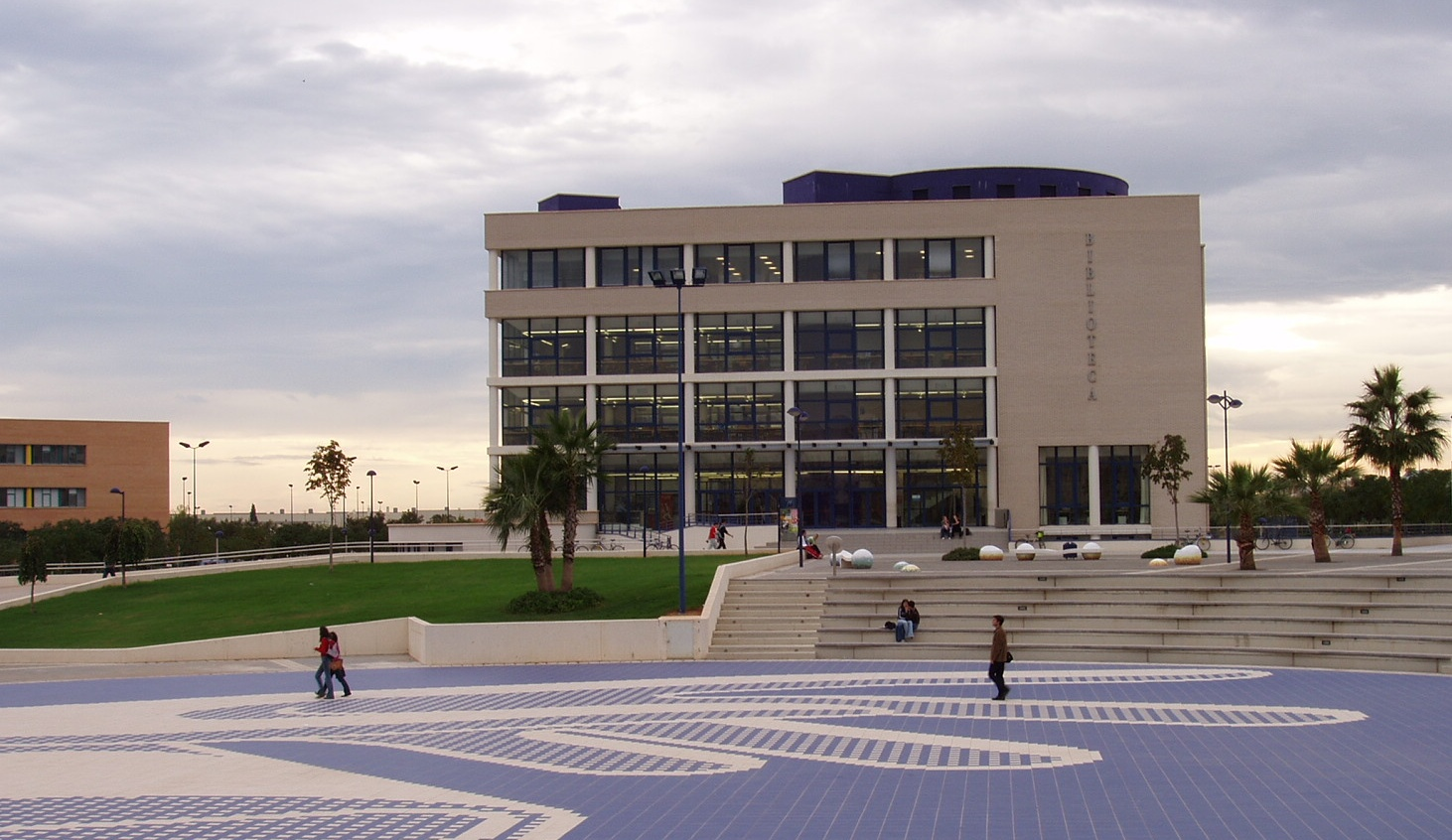
Library

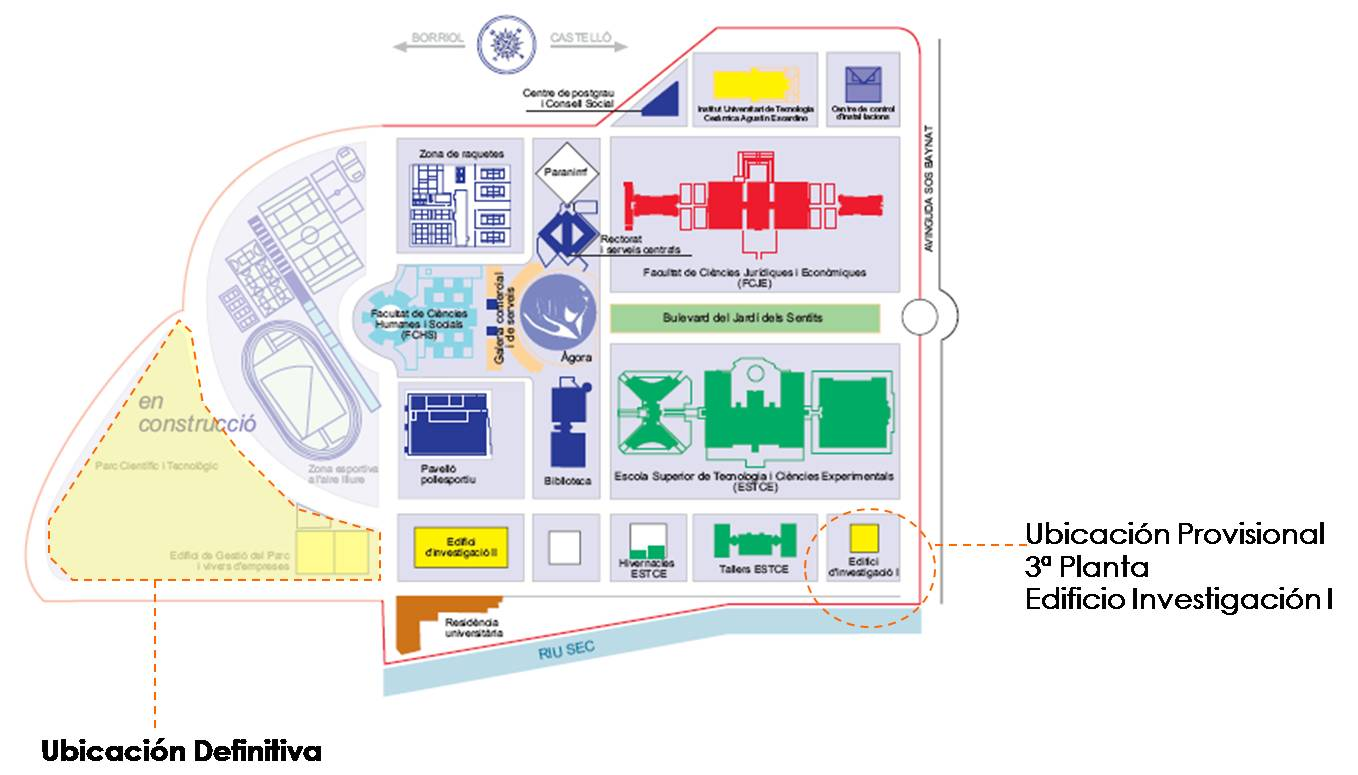
Site plan

== See also ==
- Vives Network
