= Charles J. Joachain =

Belgian physicist

Charles Jean Joachain is a Belgian physicist.

== Biography ==
Born in Brussels on 9 May 1937, Charles J. Joachain obtained his Ph.D. in Physics in 1963 at the Université libre de Bruxelles (Free University of Brussels). From 1964 to 1965 he was a Postdoctoral Fellow of the Belgian American Educational Foundation at the University of California, Berkeley and the Lawrence Berkeley Laboratory, and from 1965 to 1966 a Research Physicist at these institutions. At the Université libre de Bruxelles he was appointed chargé de cours associé in 1965, chargé de cours in 1968, professeur extraordinaire in 1971 and professeur ordinaire in 1978. He was chairman of the Department of Physics in 1980 and 1981. He was also appointed professor at the Université Catholique de Louvain in 1984. In 2002, he became professeur ordinaire émérite (Emeritus Professor) at the Université libre de Bruxelles and professeur honoraire at the Université Catholique de Louvain.

Professor Joachain has been a visiting professor in several universities and laboratories in Europe and the United States, in particular at the University of California, Berkeley and the Lawrence Berkeley Laboratory, the Université Pierre et Marie Curie (Paris VI), the University of Rome “La Sapienza” and the Max Planck Institute for Quantum Optics in Garching.

== Research activities ==
The research activities of Professor Joachain concern two areas of theoretical physics: 1) Quantum collision theory: electron and positron collisions with atomic systems, atom-atom collisions, nuclear reactions, high-energy hadron collisions with nuclei. 2) High-intensity laser-atom interactions: multiphoton ionization, harmonic generation, laser-assisted atomic collisions, attophysics, relativistic effects in laser-atom interactions.

== Publications ==
Professor Joachain has published five books : 1) "Quantum Collision Theory", North Holland, Amsterdam (1975), 2d edition (1979); 3d edition (1983). 2) "Physics of Atoms and Molecules" (with B.H. Bransden), Longman, London (1983); 2d edition, Prentice Hall-Pearson (2003). 3) "Quantum Mechanics" (with B.H. Bransden), Longman, London (1989), 2d edition, Prentice Hall- Pearson (2000). 4) "Theory of Electron-Atom Collisions. Part I. Potential Scattering" (with P.G. Burke), Plenum Press, New York (1995). 5) "Atoms in Intense Laser Fields" (with N.J. Kylstra and R.M. Potvliege), Cambridge University Press (2012).

He has co-edited four books : 1) "Atomic and Molecular Physics of Controlled Thermonuclear Fusion"(with D.E. Post), Plenum, New York (1983). 2) "Photon and Electron Collisions with Atoms and Molecules"(with P.G. Burke), Plenum, New York (1997). 3) "Atoms, Solids and Plasmas in Super-Intense Laser Fields" (with D. Batani, S. Martellucci and A.N. Chester), Kluwer Academic-Plenum, New-York (2001). 4) "Atoms and Plasmas in Super-Intense Laser Fields" (with D. Batani and S. Martellucci), Conference Proceedings, Volume 88, Italian Physical Society, Bologna (2004).

He is also the author of hundred and forty-seven research articles and forty-five review articles in theoretical physics, devoted mainly to quantum collision theory with applications to atomic, nuclear and high-energy processes and to the theory of high-intensity laser-atom interactions.

== Distinctions and prizes ==
Joachain has received many scientific distinctions and prizes, in particular the Prix Louis Empain in 1963, the Alexander von Humboldt Prize in 1998 and the Blaise Pascal Medal for Physics of the European Academy of Sciences in 2012. He was President of the Belgian Physical Society from 1987 to 1989 and of the “Institut des Hautes Etudes” of Belgium from 2006 to 2011. He has been a Fellow of the Institute of Physics (UK) since 1974, a Fellow of the American Physical Society since 1977 and a Doctor Honoris Causa of the University of Durham since 1989. He is a member of the Royal Academy of Science, Letters and Fine Arts of Belgium (President, 2015–16), of the Academia Europaea and of the European Academy of Sciences.
