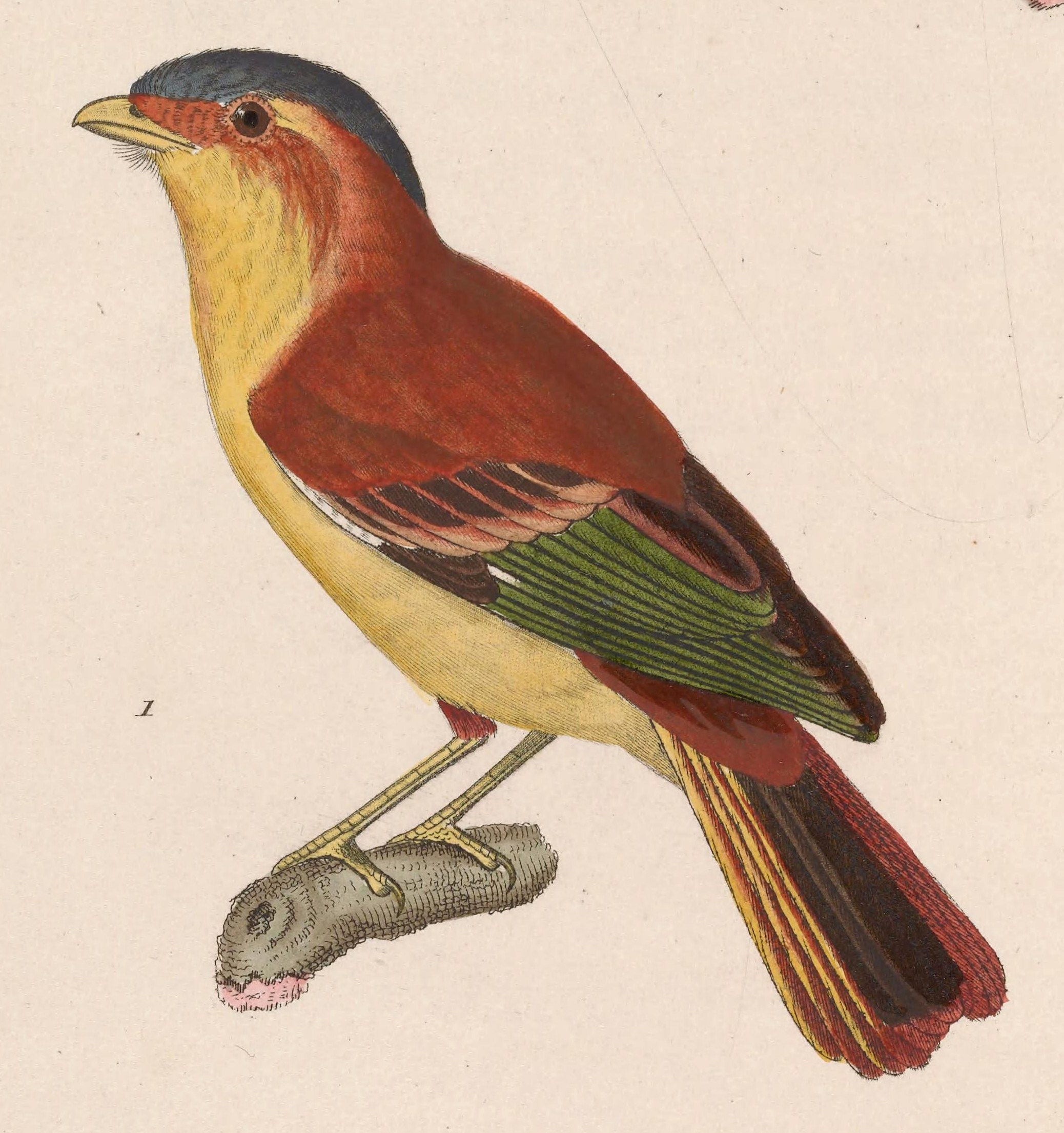
- Black-capped piprites (Piprites pileata)

Scientific classification
- Kingdom: Animalia
- Phylum: Chordata
- Class: Aves
- Order: Passeriformes
- Family: Tyrannidae
- Subfamily: Pipritinae; Ohlson, Irestedt, Ericson & Fjeldså, 2013
- Genus: Piprites; Cabanis, 1847

Type species
- Pipra pileata Temminck, 1822

= Piprites =

Genus of birds

Piprites is a genus of bird currently placed in the family Tyrannidae. Prior to 1971, the genus was placed in the family Pipridae; its designation was initially changed based on morphological evidence, and genetic evidence confirmed its placement in 2009. In 2013, it was proposed that Piprites was to be placed in the unique family Pipritinae. The proposition was declined by the Comité de Clasificación de Sudamérica, a part of the American Ornithological Society, and the proposed family was changed to be a unique subfamily of the genus. The genus is composed of three species native to the neotropical realm, with distributions ranging from the Caribbean coast of Guatemala, Central America, and southeastern Argentina.

== Etymology ==
The generic name Piprites is derived from the Greek πιπρα (pipra), meaning "small bird" and originally associated with the great spotted woodpecker and the various Neotropical manakins. The suffix ῑ́της (-ī́tēs) is also Greek and denotes "resembling" or "similar to", denoting the genus' similarity to the manakins.

== Species ==
The genus Piprites contains 3 species:

Image	Scientific name	Common name	Distribution
	Piprites chloris	Wing-barred piprites	Argentina, Bolivia, Brazil, Colombia, Ecuador, French Guiana, Guyana, Paraguay, Peru, Suriname, and Venezuela.
	Piprites griseiceps	Grey-headed piprites	Costa Rica, Guatemala, Honduras, and Nicaragua.
	Piprites pileata	Black-capped piprites	southeastern Brazil and northeastern Argentina
