= Applied Physics Letters =

Scientific journal

- Discipline: Applied physics
- Language: English
- Edited by: Maria Antonietta Loi

Publication details
- History: 1962–present
- Publisher: American Institute of Physics (United States)
- Frequency: Weekly
- Open access: Hybrid
- Impact factor: 3.8 (2025)

Standard abbreviations
- ISO 4: Appl. Phys. Lett.

Indexing
- CODEN: APPLAB
- ISSN: 0003-6951 (print); 1077-3118 (web)
- OCLC no.: 1580952

Links
- Journal homepage

Applied Physics Letters is a weekly peer-reviewed scientific journal that is published by the American Institute of Physics. Its focus is rapid publication and dissemination of new experimental and theoretical papers regarding applications of physics in all disciplines of science, engineering, and modern technology. Additionally, there is an emphasis on fundamental and new developments which lay the groundwork for fields that are rapidly evolving.

The journal was established in 1962. The editor-in-chief is physicist Maria Antonietta Loi of the University of Groningen.

== Abstracting and indexing ==
This journal is indexed in the following databases:

- Chemical Abstracts Service
- Current Contents/Physical, Chemical & Earth Sciences
- Science Citation Index Expanded

According to the Journal Citation Reports, the journal has a 2025 impact factor of 3.8.
