= Antonio Bisquert Pérez =

Antonio Bisquert Pérez (June 29, 1906, Valencia – June 8, 1990, Madrid) was a Spanish painter and restorer. He participated in the Junta for the Preservation and Protection of Spain's Artistic Treasures during the Spanish Civil War.

== Biography ==
Antonio Bisquert Pérez was born in Valencia in 1906 and manifested an artistic vocation already in his childhood. In 1925 Bisquert enrolled in the San Carlos School of Fine Arts of Valencia, where he secured all the first prizes in drawing and painting, and became a pupil of Mariano Benlliure. During these school years he also befriended several Spanish avant-garde artists, including José Renau. After graduating Bisquert took a position as a restorer of paintings in the Naval Museum of Madrid working with Julio García Condoy. In 1930 he became a professor at the "Escuela de Artes y Oficios" of Madrid. In 1934 he won the "Conde de Cartagena" fellowship from the Royal Academy of Fine Arts of San Fernando. This allowed him to spend several years abroad in France, Belgium, Holland and Germany, and to make contact with international avant-garde artists.

During the Spanish Civil War of 1936–1939 he was appointed to the board for the preservation and protection of Spain's artistic treasures ("Junta de Defensa del Tesoro Artístico"), becoming the board's technical advisor. He worked on the compilation, protection and preservation of the painting masterpieces from Spanish collections, and their eventual relocation to Valencia to save them from the bombings that were taking place in Madrid. During this time he was also appointed conservator-restorer of the Ministry of Fine Arts. During the war, Bisquert also worked for the Alliance of Antifascist Intellectuals and Artists, and he created numerous drawings and posters on social and war topics. His poster entitled "¡Por el orden republicano! : respetad la propiedad de los pequeños comerciantes e industriales" received a national award.

After the war, the Comisión de Depuraciones (Commission of Purgation) barred Bisquert from returning to his conservator-restorer post in Madrid. He opened his studio as an independent restorer, and was commissioned major jobs, such as the restoration of the paintings at Sala de Batallas, and the murals on the ceiling of the Casita del Príncipe, both at El Escorial. As a painter Bisquert went through several periods, from an early Sorolla-like luminism, passing through abstraction, with original creations in his use of the Collage technique, and returning to realism in his later period. He died in Madrid in 1990. A retrospective exhibition of Bisquert's works was organized posthumously in Madrid in 1992, along with other works from his contemporary Luis Brihuega.
