= Eriko Makimura =

Japanese pianist and performance artist

- 牧村 英里子
- Born: Kobe, Japan
- Education: Kyoto City University of Arts; Universität der Künste Berlin; Hochschule für Musik und Theater Hannover
- Occupations: Pianist, performance artist
- Years active: 2000–present
- Known for: Classical piano, performance art

Eriko Makimura (Japanese: 牧村 英里子) is a Japanese concert pianist, performance artist, and educator known for her expressive interpretations of classical music and the integration of performance art into her piano recitals. Her work often explores themes of identity, trauma, and personal freedom.

== Early life and education ==
Makimura was born in Kobe, Japan, and began playing piano at the age of two. She studied at Kyoto City University of Arts and Music under Professor A. Jinzai, earning awards from the Kyoto Music Corporation in 2002.

She pursued further studies at the Universität der Künste Berlin with Professor Klaus Hellwig, graduating with top honors in 2006. She later joined the Soloklasse program at the Hochschule für Musik und Theater Hannover under Professor Markus Becker.

== Career ==
Makimura has performed as a soloist and chamber musician throughout Europe and Japan. She has won several international competitions, including:

- 1st Prize – Chamber Music Competitions in Rome
- 2nd Prize – Chamber Music Contest in Atri, Italy (2004)
- Grand Prix – Krzysztof Penderecki International Chamber Music Competition, Kraków (2005)
- 1st Prize and Audience Prize – 2nd European Chamber Music Competition (2007)

She became a member of the European Chamber Music Academy (ECMA) in 2007.

In 2009 and 2010, she was a musical director of "Den Collinske Gaard", a new arts & exhibition salon in Copenhagen.

In 2008, she founded Eriko Makimura & Co., a solo piano and performance art network. One of the notable projects under this banner is the Seven Deadly Sins concert series, which ran from 2016 to 2022 at KoncertKirken in Copenhagen. This series blended classical piano performances with theatrical elements, showcasing her innovative approach to classical music.

Under the Cherry Trees is a performance presented — in collaboration with Frida Barfod — on 14 November 2024, at KoncertKirken in Copenhagen. The performance is part of Makimura's larger project Eriko Makimura Plays Four Seasons, which artistically interprets the seasons through a combination of piano music, theatrical elements, and visual art. The Under the Cherry Trees segment represents spring and features a piano transcription of Igor Stravinsky's The Rite of Spring.

Makimura is based in Berlin and Copenhagen. In addition to her performances, she writes essays and maintains a blog where she discusses music, art, and cultural topics.

== Artistic style ==
Makimura is known for fusing traditional piano performance with performance art. Her recitals often include spoken word, theatrical staging, and visual symbolism, challenging classical music conventions and exploring emotional and existential themes.

In an interview in 2009, Makimura discussed her experience performing with DJ Spooky, highlighting her versatility and willingness to explore different musical genres:

It was the first time I ever played with the piano amplified electrically... DJ Spooky was very charming and has interesting ideas and an impressive network of collaborators such as Pierre Boulez, Steve Reich and Ryuichi Sakamoto.

Makimura contributed a personal story to NXT Magazine, reflecting on her roots and the influence of her grandfather:

Gojo is a city where I decided to become a pianist... My grandfather was a doctor, a Buddhist scholar, an author, a pioneer of organic farming, a lifelong advocate of human justice and a huge classical music lover.

== In popular culture ==
Makimura is the subject of the 2020 Danish documentary film Being Eriko (Erikos verdener), directed by Jannik Splidsboel. The film examines her artistic journey and personal story, addressing identity, trauma, and transformation.
