= Gen Shirane =

Japanese-American physicist

Gen Shirane (kanji: 白根 元 Shirane Gen; furigana: しらね げん; May 15, 1924 in Nishinomiya, Japan – 16 January 16, 2005 in Bellport, New York) was a Japanese-American experimental solid-state physicist, known for his investigations using neutron scattering as a probe of solids. He lived most of his life in the USA.

== Biography ==
At the University of Tokyo, Shirane received his BE in engineering physics in 1944 and his DSc in physics in 1947 with a thesis on ferroelectrics. He was from 1948 to 1952 a research associate in physics at the Tokyo Institute of Technology. At Pennsylvania State University he was from 1952 to 1955 a research associate and from 1955 to 1956 an assistant professor of physics. From 1956 to 1957 he was an associate physicist at Brookhaven National Laboratory. At Westinghouse Research Laboratories in Pittsburgh, he was from 1957 to 1958 a research physicist and from 1959 to 1963 an advising physicist. At Brookhaven National Laboratory he was from 1963 to 1968 a physicist and from 1968 to 2005 a senior physicist.

Gen moved permanently to Brookhaven in 1963, as the Brookhaven High Flux Beam Reactor construction was being completed, and he contributed to the development of a suite of experimental instruments. The increased neutron flux made possible inelastic neutron-scattering experiments using the triple-axis spectrometer developed by Bertram Brockhouse in Canada. Optimizing the signal-to-noise ratio in these instruments is an art form in which Gen quickly established himself as a virtuoso, and that expertise led ultimately to his publication, with co-authors Stephen Shapiro and John Tranquada, of the definitive monograph on that subject.

He worked on spin-wave dispersions and critical phenomena in ferromagnets, the soft phonon mode and the structural transition in SrTiO_{3}, spin fluctuations in low-dimensional antiferromagnets, electron-phonon coupling in superconducting Nb_{3}Sn, spin waves in chromium, and eventually high-temperature superconductors.

In the late 1960s and early 1970s, Shirane with co-workers confirmed the soft mode theory of P. W. Anderson and W. Cochran and discovered new features of structural phase transitions beyond the soft mode theory.

Shirane was a leading international authority on neutron spectroscopy in solid-state physics, including magnetic materials and high-T_{c} superconductivity. He trained many younger physicists in neutron scattering and effectively promoted collaborations between Japan and the USA. He was the author or co-author of over 750 scientific publications with nearly 40,000 citations by the year of his death. His h-index was 103.

== Awards and honors ==
- 1973 — Oliver E. Buckley Condensed Matter Prize, American Physical Society
- 1973 — Warren Award of the American Crystallographic Association
- 1989 — Member of the National Academy of Sciences
- 1989 — DOE Award for Outstanding Scientific Accomplishment in Solid State Physics
- 1991 — Fellow of the American Academy of Arts and Sciences
- 2003 — Award for Outstanding Accomplishment, Japanese Society for Neutron Science

== Selected publications ==
- with Franco Jona: Ferroelectric Crystals. Pergamon Press. 1962; 402 pages; Dover reprint, 1993
- with Stephen M. Shapiro and John M. Tranquada: Neutron scattering with a triple-axis spectrometer : basic techniques. Cambridge University Press. 2002. ISBN 9781139431019.
