= Eriko Takano =

Japanese-British biologist

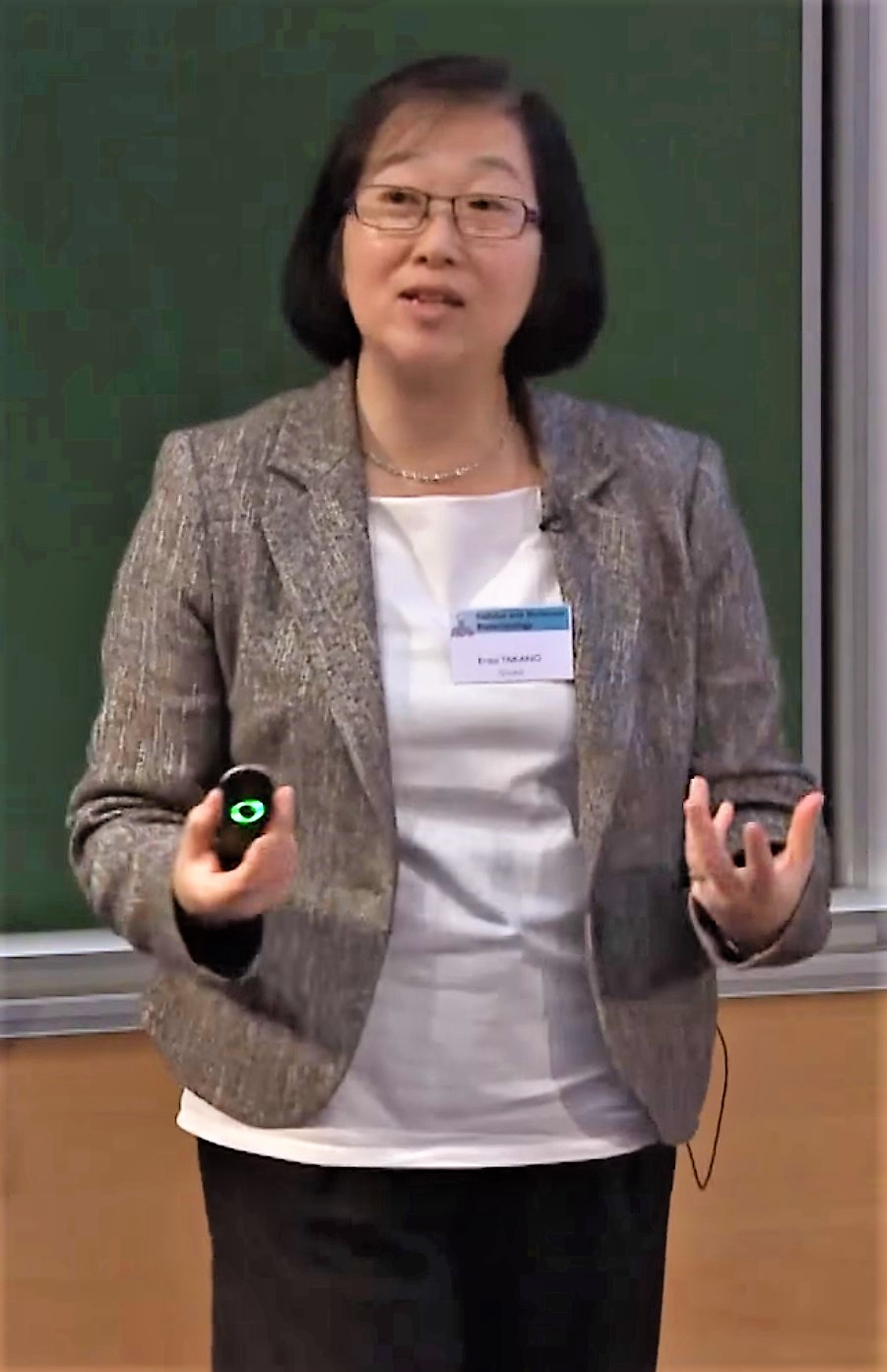
- Eriko Takano lectures for the Institut des Hautes Études Scientifiques in 2015
- Education: Kitasato University (BSc); University of East Anglia (PhD)
- Known for: Synthetic Biology
- Scientific career
- Workplaces: University of East Anglia; University of Manchester; University of Tübingen; University of Groningen
- Thesis: ppGpp and antibiotic production in Streptomyces coelicolor A3(2) (1993)
- Website: www.research.manchester.ac.uk/portal/eriko.takano.html

Eriko Takano is a professor of synthetic biology and a director of the Synthetic Biology Research Centre for Fine and Speciality Chemicals (SYNBIOCHEM) at the University of Manchester. She develops antibiotics and other high-value chemicals using microbial synthetic biology tools.

== Early life and education ==
Takano was born in Japan. She studied pharmacy at Kitasato University and graduated in 1985. After graduating she worked as a researcher in the Meiji Seika Kaisha Department of Genetics. She moved to the United Kingdom for her graduate studies, where she joined the John Innes Centre. In 1994 she earned her PhD at the University of East Anglia, and she was appointed a postdoctoral researcher in the molecular biology department.

== Research and career ==
In 2002 Takano was appointed an assistant professor in the Department of Microbiology at University of Tübingen. Here she worked on the γ-butyrolactone molecules that act to regulate antibiotic production and morphological differentiation in Streptomyces. She was made a Rosalind Franklin Fellow at the University of Groningen in 2006 and promoted to associate professor in 2010.

In 2012 Takano was made Professor of Synthetic Biology at the University of Manchester. She leads the biotechnology theme in the Faculty of Life Sciences. Her research considers synthetic biology for the production of antibiotics, as well as the development of software for bioinformatics that can design natural products. Her software contributions includes antiSMASH and MultiGeneBlast. These can include the secondary biosynthetic pathways that have been identified from any genome sequence. Genome sequencing offers new opportunities to find production pathways for antibiotics. Takano is developing robotic systems to explore the potential biosynthetic pathways, testing thousands of new compounds every year.

Takano is a director of the European Centre of Excellence Synthetic Biology Research Centre for Fine and Speciality Chemicals (SYNBIOCHEM). In 2015 Vince Cable announced a £10 million investment into Synthetic Biology to the Manchester Institute of Biotechnology, University of Manchester.

=== Awards and honours ===
Her awards and honours include;

- 1993 Italian Society for General Microbiology Lepetit Award
- 1994 Natio Foundation Naito Kinen Kaigai Ryigaku Jyoseikin
- 2006 Rosalind Franklin Fellowship

=== Selected publications ===
Her publications include;

- antiSMASH 3.0—a comprehensive resource for the genome mining of biosynthetic gene clusters
- Tanako, Eriko (2011). "antiSMASH: rapid identification, annotation and analysis of secondary metabolite biosynthesis gene clusters in bacterial and fungal genome sequences". Nucleic Acids Research. 39 (Web Server issue): W339–W346. doi:10.1093/nar/gkr466. PMC 3125804. PMID 21672958.
- Tanako, Eriko (2013). "antiSMASH 2.0—a versatile platform for genome mining of secondary metabolite producers". Nucleic Acids Research. 41 (Web Server issue): W204–W212. doi:10.1093/nar/gkt449. PMC 3692088. PMID 23737449.
