= Ruyan Guo =

Electrical engineer

Ruyan Guo is an electrical engineer and the Robert E. Clarke Endowed Professor at the University of Texas, San Antonio. Guo was named a Fellow of the Institute of Electrical and Electronics Engineers (IEEE) in 2013 for her contributions to the understanding of polarization phenomena in ferroelectric solid-solution systems.
