= Nathalia Novaes =

Brazilian model

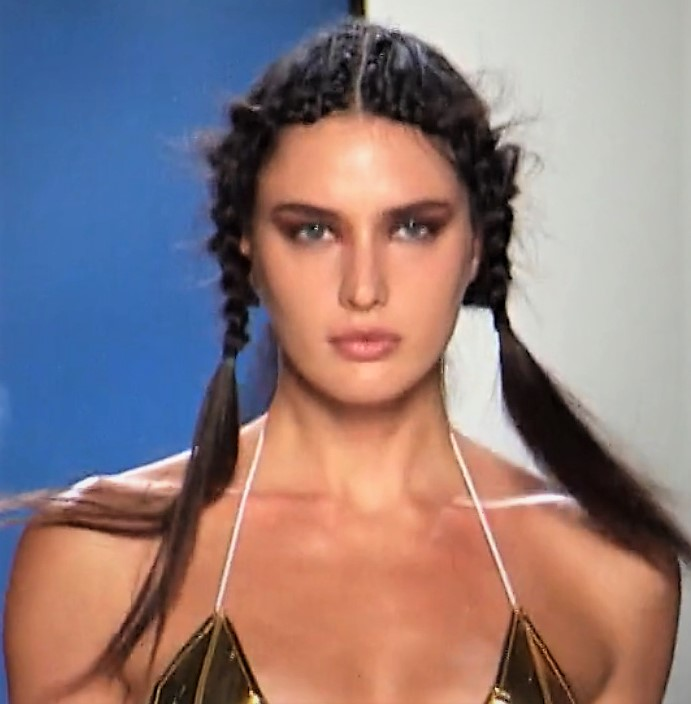
Novaes at New York Fashion Week 2018

Nathalia Novaes (born June 22, 1990) is a Brazilian model.

She has worked with Marie Claire, Glamour and Vogue.

Novaes became known for her efforts to lose weight and fit fashion industry beauty standards, sometimes using dangerous methods that led to her being hospitalized.
