= Eriko Kimura =

Japanese director of audiography (born 1961)

Eriko Kimura (木村 絵理子, Kimura Eriko; born July 5, 1961) is a Japanese director of audiography. She is best known for acting as the voice director for foreign film dubs that are localized by Tohokushinsha Film. In recent years she has directed the voice acting of films created by Studio Ghibli and the works of Masaaki Yuasa since 2010.

== Biography ==
Kimura worked at a video production company before joining Tohokushinsha Film in 1989, and began voice directing for Japanese dubs of foreign films. She made her anime debut in voice directing with the 2004 anime Yakitate!! Japan. She was hired as the studio wanted someone who was responsible for dubs to handle the voice direction. Since then, she has been the go-to voice director for Studio Ghibli starting with Ponyo. She has also worked with Masaaki Yuasa since The Tatami Galaxy.

== Works ==
=== Television animation ===
- Yakitate!! Japan (2004–2006)
- Cluster Edge (2005–2006)
- Kekkaishi (2006–2007)
- Tales of the Abyss (2008–2009)
- The Tatami Galaxy (2010)
- Tiger & Bunny (2011)
- Ping Pong the Animation (2014)
- Gundam Reconguista in G (2014–2015)
- Cheer Boys!! (2016)
- Altair: A Record of Battles (2017)
- Double Decker! Doug & Kirill (2018)
- Phantasy Star Online 2: Episode Oracle (2019)
- Keep Your Hands Off Eizouken! (2020)
- Sakugan (2021)
- Dan Da Dan (2024)
- Agents of the Four Seasons (TBA)

=== OVA ===
- Urusei Yatsura: The Obstacle Course Swim Meet (2008)
- Kidō Senshi Gundam UC (2010)

=== ONA ===
- Mobile Suit Gundam Thunderbolt (2015)
- Devilman Crybaby (2018)
- Japan Sinks: 2020 (2020)
- Transformers: War for Cybertron Trilogy (2020)
- The Heike Story (2021)
- Scott Pilgrim Takes Off (2023)

=== Film ===
- Ponyo (2008)
- Arrietty (2010)
- From Up on Poppy Hill (2011)
- Tiger & Bunny: The Beginning (2012)
- The Wind Rises (2013)
- The Night Is Short, Walk On Girl (2017)
- Lu over the Wall (2017)
- Mobile Suit Gundam Narrative (2018)
- Penguin Highway (2018)
- The House of the Lost on the Cape (2021)
- Inu-Oh (2021)
- Look Back (2024)
- My Oni Girl (2024)

=== Video games ===
- Crash Bandicoot (1996)
- Crash Bandicoot 2: Cortex Strikes Back (1997)
- Sonic Adventure (1998)
- Crash Team Racing (1999)
- Sonic Shuffle (2000)
- Sonic Adventure 2 (2001)
- Sonic Heroes (2003)
- Sonic Advance 3 (2004)
- Shadow the Hedgehog (2005)
- Sonic the Hedgehog (2006)
- Sonic and the Secret Rings (2007)
- Sonic and the Black Knight (2009)
- Mario & Sonic at the London 2012 Olympic Games (2011)
- Sonic Generations (2011)
- Sonic Lost World (2013)

=== Dubbing ===
- Return from Witch Mountain (date unknown)
- Saludos Amigos (date unknown)
- Married to the Mob (TV Tokyo dub, date unknown)
- Pancho Barnes (TV Tokyo dub, date unknown)
- Dead Again (TV Asahi dub, date unknown)
- Cagney & Lacey (date unknown)
- She-Devil (TV dub, date unknown)
- King of the Grizzlies (NHK-BS2 dub, date unknown)
- The Bay Boy (TV dub, date unknown)
- RoboCop (TV Asahi dub, April 1, 1990)
- Top Secret! (TV Asahi dub, April 7, 1990)
- Shane (TV Tokyo dub, October 11, 1990)
- Out on Bail (TV Tokyo dub, November 8, 1990)
- Jetsons: The Movie (1991?)
- Defense Play (TV Tokyo dub, February 14, 1991)
- Desperately Seeking Susan (TV Asahi dub, October 12, 1991)
- Downtown (May 1, 1992)
- Flowers in the Attic (TV Tokyo dub, August 27, 1992)
- Back to School (TV Asahi dub, October 6, 1992)
- Look Who's Talking (Nippon TV dub, October 30, 1992)
- A Chinese Ghost Story II (TV Tokyo dub, November 5, 1992)
- Killer Klowns from Outer Space (TV Tokyo dub, January 15, 1993)
- Tank (TV Asahi dub, April 22, 1993)
- Wayne's World (June 25, 1993)
- The Mighty Ducks (January 21, 1994)
- Honey, I Shrunk the Kids (Fuji TV dub, April 30, 1994)
- Look Who's Talking Too (Nippon TV dub, May 27, 1994)
- The Sandlot (June 22, 1994)
- Red Blooded American Girl (TV Tokyo dub, June 30, 1994)
- Beaches (TV Tokyo dub, August 11, 1994)
- N.Y.P.D. Mounted (TV Tokyo dub, September 1, 1994)
- Iron Will (January 20, 1995)
- Au Revoir Mon Amour (January 27, 1995)
- Pulp Fiction (February 24, 1995)
- Stormy Monday (TV Tokyo dub, March 9, 1995)
- Maurice (TV Tokyo dub, March 31, 1995)
- The Jungle Book (In-flight screening dub, April 23, 1995)
- D2: The Mighty Ducks (August 19, 1995)
- Dinosaurs (1995-1996)
- Sleeping Beauty (December 16, 1995)
- Boys on the Side (February 1, 1996)
- Sister Act (Nippon TV dub, April 26, 1996)
- Only You (April 21, 1996)
- The Baby-Sitters Club (September 21, 1996)
- The Sweeper (TV Tokyo dub, December 5, 1996)
- James and the Giant Peach (December 14, 1996)
- Free Willy (TV Asahi dub, May 4, 1997)
- Sister Act 2: Back in the Habit (Nippon TV dub, September 19, 1997)
- Up the Creek (TV Tokyo dub, September 24, 1997)
- The Dark Half (TV Tokyo dub, October 16, 1997)
- French Kiss (Nippon TV dub, October 31, 1997)
- Run (TV Tokyo dub, November 20, 1997)
- Terminal Velocity (TV Asahi dub, December 7, 1997)
- The Accused (TV Asahi dub, February 15, 1998)
- Another 48 Hrs. (Nippon TV dub, February 20, 1998)
- Addicted to Love (March 5, 1998)
- Forever Young (TV Asahi dub, May 10, 1998)
- Another Stakeout (Nippon TV dub, June 19, 1998)
- Pure Danger (TV Tokyo dub, July 23, 1998)
- Pooh's Grand Adventure: The Search for Christopher Robin (August 21, 1998)
- Intensity (October 23, 1998)
- The Swan Princess III: The Mystery of the Enchanted Treasure (October 23, 1998)
- Casper (Nippon TV dub, November 13, 1998)
- Cats Don't Dance (November 19, 1998)
- Free Willy 2: The Adventure Home (TV Asahi dub, November 22, 1998)
- Coming to America (Nippon TV dub, March 5, 1999)
- Babe (Nippon TV dub, March 19, 1999)
- Excess Baggage (April 2, 1999)
- City of Angels (April 8, 1999)
- You've Got Mail (August 5, 1999)
- Class of 1999 (August 22, 1999)
- The Lion King II: Simba's Pride (August 26, 1999)
- Dance with Me (August 27, 1999)
- Polish Wedding (October 22, 1999)
- Ghost (TV Asahi dub, October 24, 1999)
- Ghostbusters (November 26, 1999)
- Stepmom (November 26, 1999)
- Alice in Wonderland (December 3, 1999)
- At First Sight (December 10, 1999)
- West Side Story (TV Tokyo dub, December 28, 1999)
- Go (January 14, 2000)
- Jawbreaker (February 11, 2000)
- The Nutty Professor (Nippon TV dub, March 24, 2000)
- Maximum Risk (TV Asahi dub, April 16, 2000)
- The Deep End of the Ocean (April 21, 2000)
- My Favorite Martian (May 17, 2000)
- Wild Wild West (June 9, 2000)
- A Civil Action (June 23, 2000)
- The Iron Giant (July 20, 2000)
- The Distinguished Gentleman (TV Asahi dub, August 6, 2000)
- Virtuosity (Fuji TV dub, August 26, 2000)
- The Little Mermaid II: Return to the Sea (August 31, 2000)
- My Best Friend's Wedding (Nippon TV dub, September 15, 2000)
- The Many Adventures of Winnie the Pooh (September 20, 2000)
- Buster & Chauncey's Silent Night (November 24, 2000)
- Stuart Little (December 22, 2000)
- The Virgin Suicides (December 22, 2000)
- The Graduate (TV Tokyo dub, December 24, 2000)
- Men in Black (Nippon TV dub, January 12, 2001)
- The Tigger Movie (March 16, 2001)
- 101 Dalmatians (TV Asahi dub, March 25, 2001)
- Mercury Rising (TV Asahi dub, April 15, 2001)
- Charlie's Angels (May 25, 2001)
- Quarantine (June 8, 2001)
- MouseHunt (TBS dub, August 1, 2001)
- Eyes Wide Shut (August 23, 2001)
- Snatch (September 28, 2001)
- Notting Hill (Nippon TV dub, December 7, 2001)
- Monsters, Inc. (March 2, 2002)
- Babe: Pig in the City (Nippon TV dub, April 12, 2002)
- The Hunchback of Notre Dame II (April 20, 2002)
- Glitter (April 26, 2002)
- Harry Potter and the Philosopher's Stone (May 15, 2002)
- Bean (Nippon TV dub, June 21, 2002)
- Tom and Jerry: The Magic Ring (July 5, 2002)
- Vidocq (July 5, 2002)
- Riding in Cars with Boys (August 23, 2002)
- Wild Wild West (Nippon TV dub, September 27, 2002)
- A Very Merry Pooh Year (November 8, 2002)
- Charlie's Angels: Full Throttle (November 12, 2003)
- 101 Dalmatians II: Patch's London Adventure (December 6, 2002)
- Stuart Little 2 (December 18, 2002)
- Bichunmoo (January 18, 2003)
- Gabriel & Me (January 22, 2003)
- Who Am I? (TV Asahi dub, February 23, 2003)
- Gongdong Gyeongbi Guyeok JSA (Nippon TV dub, February 28, 2003)
- The Dangerous Lives of Altar Boys (March 5, 2003)
- Harry Potter and the Chamber of Secrets (April 25, 2003)
- Romeo Must Die (TV Asahi dub, April 27, 2003)
- The Transporter (July 4, 2003)
- My Sassy Girl (July 25, 2003)
- The Country Bears (August 6, 2003)
- Analyze That (September 5, 2003)
- Kiss of the Dragon (TV Tokyo dub, September 18, 2003)
- What Women Want (Nippon TV dub, September 19, 2003)
- Heart of Dixie (TV Tokyo dub, October 3, 2003)
- Finding Nemo (December 6, 2003)
- City of God (December 21, 2003)
- Armageddon (Nippon TV dub, January 9, 2004)
- The Lion King 1½ (March 19, 2004)
- Springtime with Roo (April 23, 2004)
- Pollock (April 28, 2004)
- Piglet's Big Movie (August 6, 2004)
- Peter Pan (August 25, 2004)
- Anger Management (September 1, 2004)
- Calendar Girls (October 20, 2004)
- Lost in Translation (December 3, 2004)
- The Incredibles (December 4, 2004)
- Veronica Guerin (December 15, 2004)
- Harry Potter and the Prisoner of Azkaban (December 17, 2004)
- A.I. Artificial Intelligence (TBS dub, January 12, 2005)
- King Arthur (January 21, 2005)
- I Am Sam (Nippon TV dub, March 4, 2005)
- The One (TV Tokyo dub, March 24, 2005)
- Tom and Jerry: Blast Off to Mars (March 25, 2005)
- Men in Black II (TV Asahi dub, March 27, 2005)
- Head in the Clouds (April 20, 2005)
- Silmido (TV Asahi dub, June 5, 2005)
- Top Gun (Nippon TV dub, July 1, 2005)
- Pooh's Heffalump Movie (September 21, 2005)
- Pooh's Heffalump Halloween Movie (September 21, 2005)
- House of Flying Daggers (TV Asahi dub, October 30, 2005)
- Tom and Jerry: The Fast and the Furry (November 25, 2005)
- Harry Potter and the Goblet of Fire (November 26, 2005)
- Bewitched (December 21, 2005)
- Chicken Little (December 23, 2005)
- Enough (TV Tokyo dub, March 2, 2006)
- The Chronicles of Narnia: The Lion, the Witch and the Wardrobe (March 4, 2006)
- Stuart Little 3: Call of the Wild (March 17, 2006)
- Bad Boys II (TV Asahi dub, May 7, 2006)
- Cars (July 1, 2006)
  - Tokyo Mater (August 1, 2009)
- Unfaithful (TV Asahi dub, July 16, 2006)
- Tube (TV Asahi dub, July 30, 2006)
- A Knight's Tale (Nippon TV dub, August 18, 2006)
- Signs (Fuji TV dub, August 19, 2006)
- Underworld: Evolution (August 23, 2006)
- Hannah Montana (October 14, 2006 – 2011)
- Racing Stripes (Nippon TV dub, November 17, 2006)
- Good Night, and Good Luck (November 22, 2006)
- Unleashed / Danny the Dog (TV Tokyo dub, July 12, 2007)
- Harry Potter and the Order of the Phoenix (July 20, 2007)
- The Pursuit of Happyness (July 25, 2007)
- Ratatouille (July 28, 2007)
- Typhoon (TV Asahi dub, August 12, 2007)
- Imagine Me & You (September 7, 2007)
- Meet the Robinsons (December 22, 2007)
- No Reservations (February 8, 2008)
- Hoodwinked! (February 20, 2008)
- The Golden Compass (March 1, 2008)
- Paycheck (TV Asahi dub, March 16, 2008)
- The Chronicles of Narnia: Prince Caspian (May 21, 2008)
- WALL-E (December 5, 2008)
- Dadnapped (June 15, 2009)
- Harry Potter and the Half-Blood Prince (July 15, 2009)
- Underworld: Rise of the Lycans (August 5, 2009)
- Gridiron Gang (September 2, 2009)
- Cloudy with a Chance of Meatballs (September 19, 2009)
- Up (December 5, 2009)
- Hannah Montana: The Movie (June 9, 2010)
- It's Complicated (July 2, 2010)
- The Last Song (October 20, 2010)
- Where the Wild Things Are (November 3, 2010)
- Harry Potter and the Deathly Hallows - Part 1 (November 19, 2010)
- The Phantom of the Opera (Nippon TV dub, December 17, 2010)
- The Sound of Music (TV Tokyo dub, January 4, 2011)
- The Chronicles of Narnia: The Voyage of the Dawn Treader (February 25, 2011)
- Harry Potter and the Deathly Hallows - Part 2 (July 15, 2011)
- Winnie the Pooh (September 3, 2011)
- The Three Musketeers (October 28, 2011)
- Arthur Christmas (November 23, 2011)
- Happy Feet Two (November 26, 2011)
- Dark Shadows (May 19, 2012)
- Underworld: Awakening (July 11, 2012)
- Hotel Transylvania (September 29, 2012)
- Mirror Mirror (March 2, 2013)
- Monsters University (July 6, 2013)
- The Dictator (August 9, 2013)
- Gambit (November 2, 2013)
- Cloudy with a Chance of Meatballs 2 (December 28, 2013)
- Hope Springs (March 4, 2014)
- Megamind (March 5, 2014)
- Annie (January 24, 2015)
- Moomins on the Riviera (February 13, 2015)
- The Young and Prodigious T. S. Spivet (June 2, 2015)
- The Little Prince (November 21, 2015)
- The Peanuts Movie (December 4, 2015)
- Hotel Transylvania 2 (February 20, 2016)
- Purple Noon (Star Channel dub, April 16, 2016)
- Finding Dory (July 16, 2016)
- Gods of Egypt (September 9, 2016)
- Fantastic Beasts and Where to Find Them (November 23, 2016)
- Jurassic World (Nippon TV dub, August 4, 2017)
- Early Man (July 6, 2018)
- Ocean's 8 (August 10, 2018)
- Hotel Transylvania 3: Summer Vacation (October 19, 2018)
- Fantastic Beasts: The Crimes of Grindelwald (November 23, 2018)
- The Man Who Invented Christmas (November 30, 2018)
- Avengers: Endgame (April 26, 2019)
- Mad Max: Fury Road (The Cinema dub, July 27, 2019)
- Tom & Jerry (March 19, 2021)
- Fantastic Beasts: The Secrets of Dumbledore (April 8, 2022)
