= Eriko Hattori =

American artist

Eriko Hattori is an American visual artist and designer, living in Pittsburgh, Pennsylvania. Hattori uses the pronouns they/them.

== Early life and education ==
Eriko Hattori grew up in Morgantown, West Virginia. They are of Japanese heritage, queer and non-binary.

Hattori graduated in 2013, from the Rhode Island School of Design in Providence, Rhode Island, earning a BFA degree in painting.

== Career ==
After spending time in New Orleans, in 2017, Hattori moved to Western Pennsylvania and settled in Pittsburgh. They established their studio practice and became active in the art community locally. They were a resident artist at the Brew House Distillery program in Pittsburgh, Pennsylvania, from 2020 to 2021. In 2025, he works as a designer at Casey Droege Cultural Productions in Pittsburgh.

Hattori was a participant in the group exhibition Plain Silk, Uncarved Wood (2022) curated by Brent Nakamoto, held at the Associated Artists of Pittsburgh, Lawrenceville. They were also part of the group exhibition Stuck in Saṃsāra (2026) at Bunker Project in Pittsburgh, a group show curated by Brent Nakamoto that aimed to explore themes of desire and perception within contemporary art. Hattori's work has been exhibited in duo and group exhibitions across the United States and has been featured in Art Maze Magazine, the GIFC World Tour, and Field Projects Gallery's Corona Care online project.

Coverage in Booooooom magazine describes Hattori's work as drawing on Japanese mythology, pop culture, and personal experience to examine perceptions of femininity and the commodification of bodies and culture. They use imagery combined with symbolism and folklore to investigate tension between their non-binary queer identity and their Japanese cultural heritage. Hattori's work often incorporates a rotating set of avatars acting as symbolic figures within conversations about perversion, desire and fetishization of bodies.
