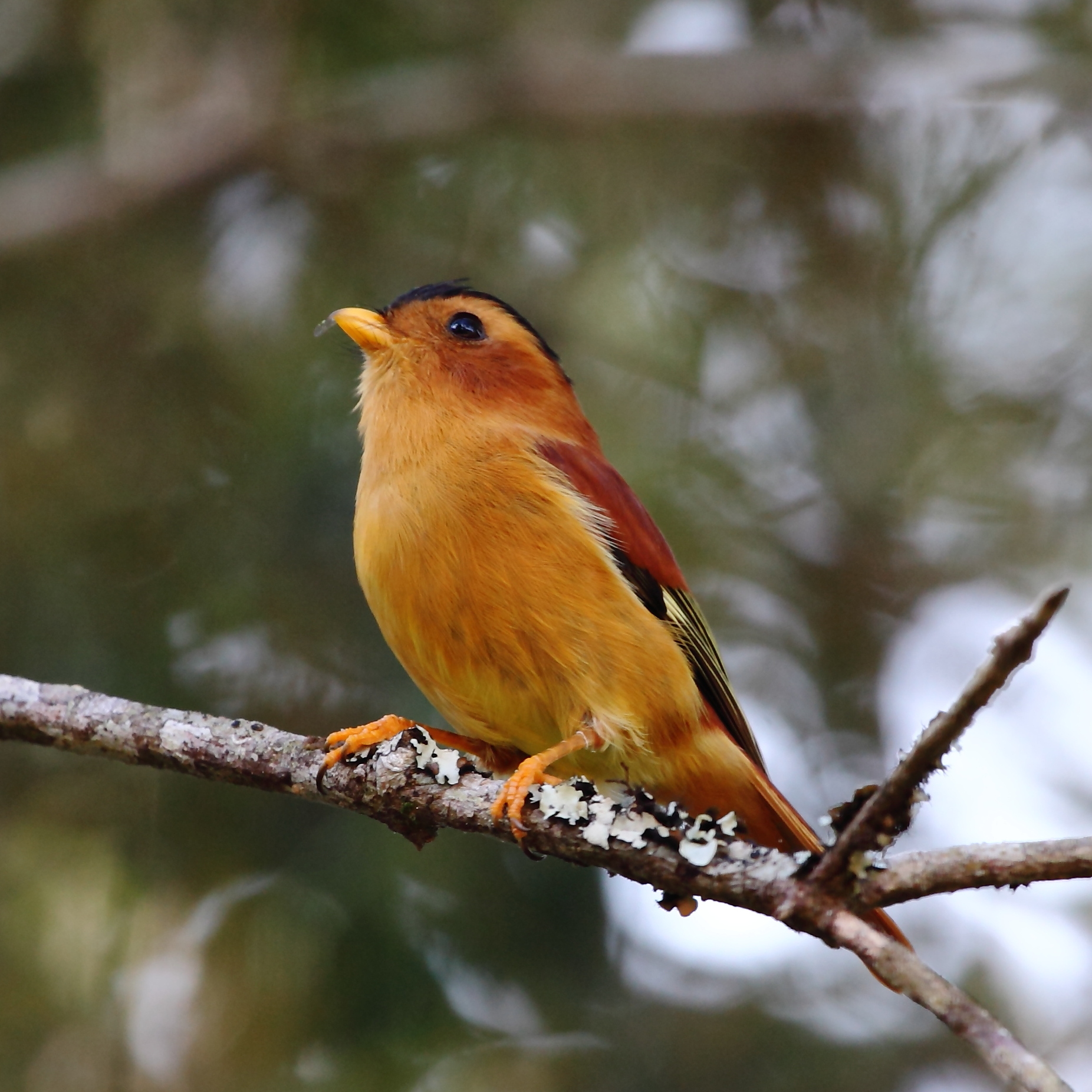
- Male at Campos do Jordão, São Paulo state, Brazil
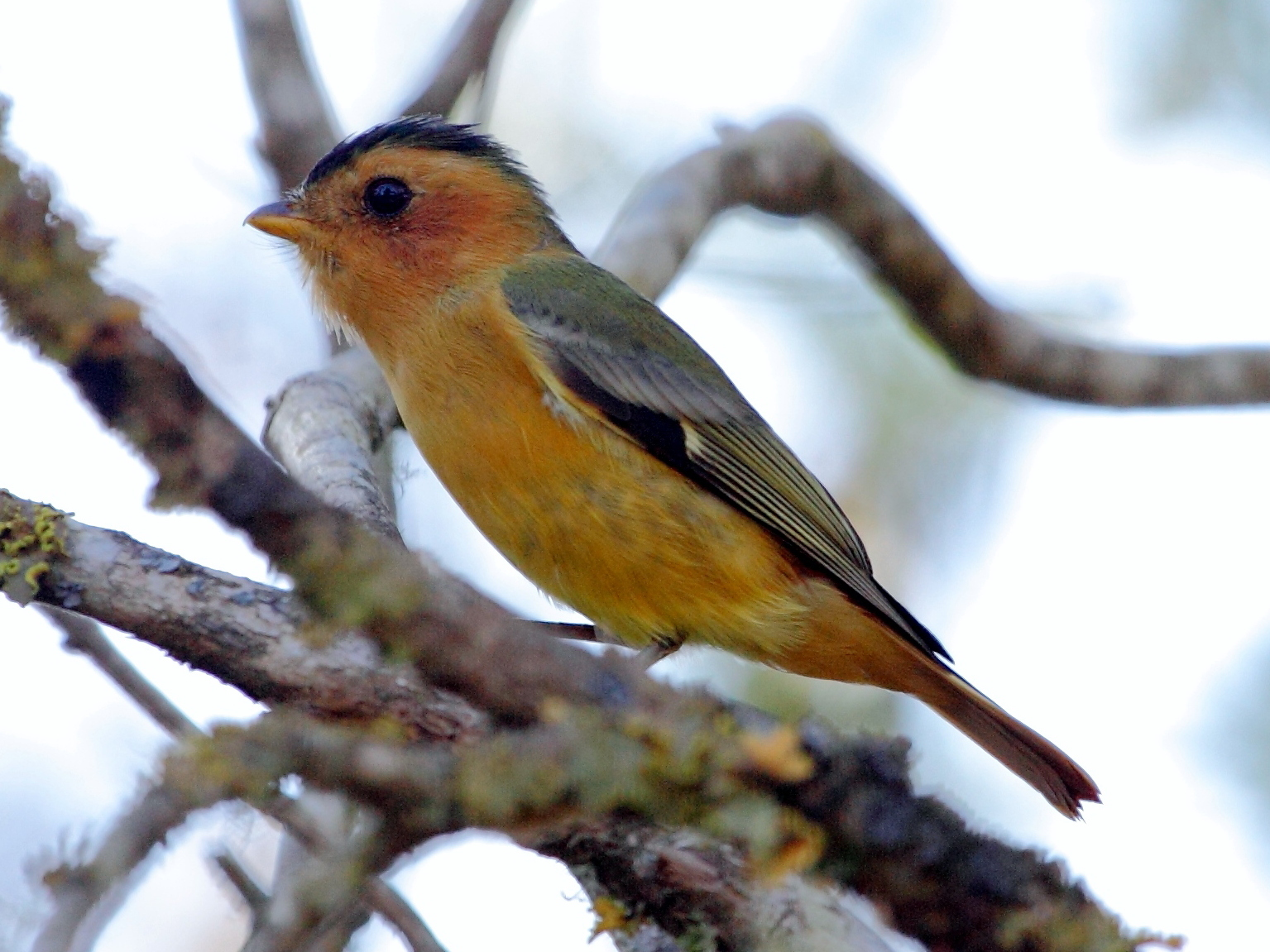
- Female at Campos do Jordão, São Paulo state, Brazil

Conservation status
- Near Threatened (IUCN 3.1)

Scientific classification
- Kingdom: Animalia
- Phylum: Chordata
- Class: Aves
- Order: Passeriformes
- Family: Tyrannidae
- Genus: Piprites
- Species: P. pileata

Binomial name
- Piprites pileata (Temminck, 1822)

Synonyms
- Piprites pileatus

= Black-capped piprites =

Species of bird

The black-capped piprites (Piprites pileata), also known as the black-capped manakin, bailarín castaño, or piprites capirotado, is a species of suboscine passerine. It has been placed in the genus Piprites, part of the Tyrannidae family. Previously, the species was included in the family Pipridae, but was reclassified following genetic studies.

It is found in the Atlantic Forest, especially in regions where Araucaria angustifolia are found, in the highlands of southeastern Brazil and northeastern Argentina. Until the recent rediscovery in Argentina, the only confirmed record there was a specimen taken in 1959. It is considered as rare and its population is in decline; it is considered vulnerable by BirdLife International. It is known from a number of protected areas, including the Itatiaia National Park in Rio de Janeiro, and Campos do Jordão State Park in São Paulo.

== Distribution and habitat ==
The black-capped piprites is distributed unevenly in the southeastern region of Brazil (south of Minas Gerais and the state of Rio de Janeiro) and in the extreme northeast of Argentina, in the province of Misiones.

The species is found in the canopy and subcanopy around the edge of the Atlantic Forest, especially in regions where Brazilian pines are found. It is found at altitudes from 500 to 2,000 meters.

== Description ==
The adult black-capped piprites is a tyranid with a black cap and yellow beak. Its length has been measured to range from 12–12.5 centimetres (4.7–4.9 in). It has contrasting chestnut-colored upperparts, yellow legs, blackish and yellow-green remiges. In males, primary feathers are notably whitish. Females resemble males, though they are drab olive colored above rather than chestnut. The juvenile has not been described.

=== Diet ===
Black-capped piprites feed on small fruits and arthropods. They have been recorded as feeding in the canopy, subcanopy and understorey of Chusquea bamboo thickets.

=== Reproduction ===
The male black-capped piprites has a display ritual it performs during the mating season. Little else is known about their reproduction. The mating season takes place between September and November; nest construction has been observed in October.

=== Vocalizations ===
The species' calls include a single "whééu" sound, followed by a variable series of brief, softer vocalizations.

== Conservation ==
The black-capped piprites is classified as near-threatened by the International Union for Conservation of Nature, though it was classified as vulnerable in 2016, due to its small range and fragmented and declining population. In 2020, its total population was estimated at 2,800 to 22,400 mature individuals. Its range is limited by the presence of Brazilian pines; recommendations have been made to remediate the declining Brazilian pine population in order to support the black-capped piprites species.

== Systematics ==
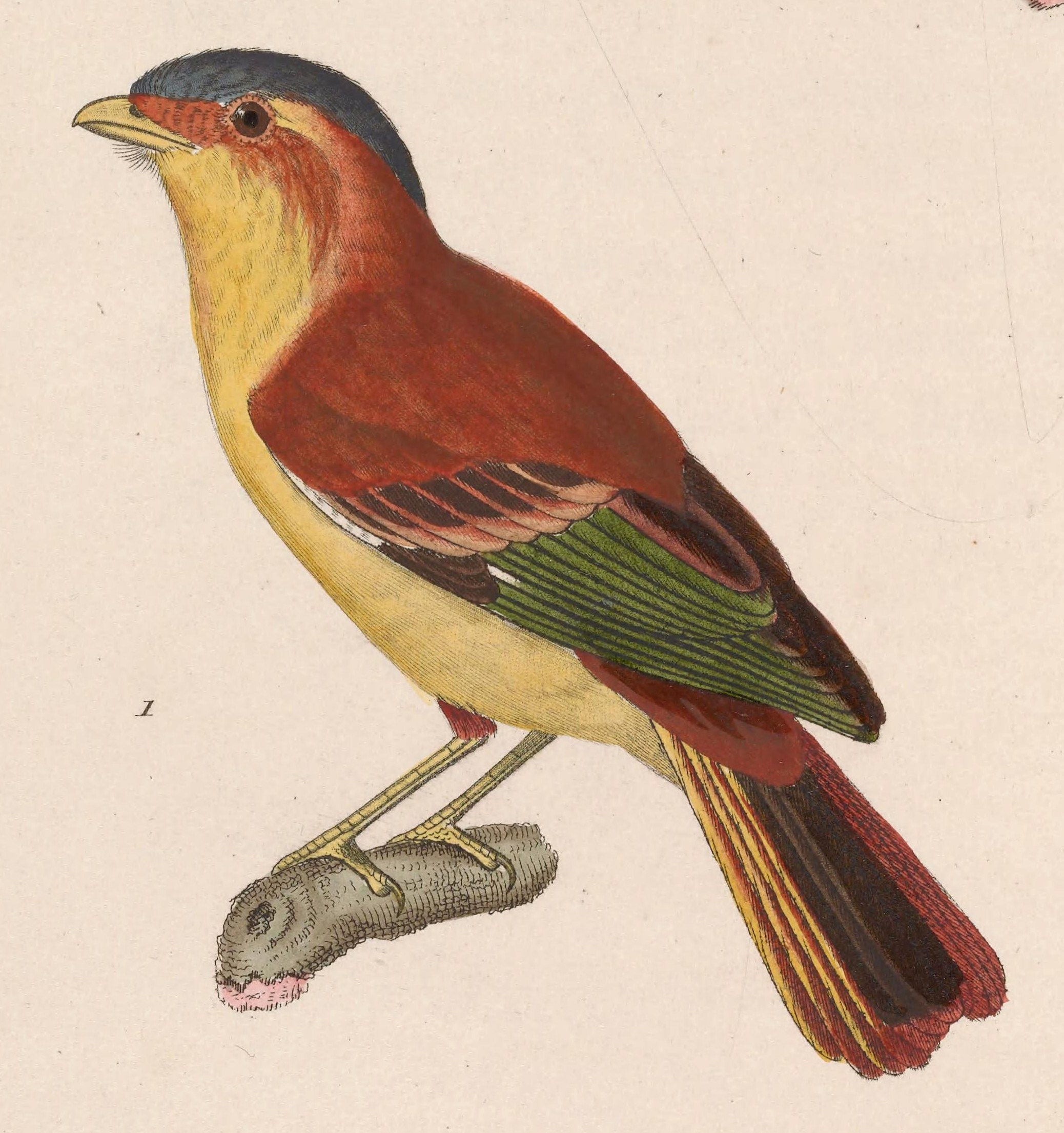
Piprites pileata; illustration 1838

=== Original description ===
The species P. pileatus was first described in 1822 by Dutch zoologist Coenraad Jacob Temminck; its type locality is Curitiba, Paraná, Brazil.

=== Etymology ===
The generic name Piprites comes from the Greek πιπρα (pipra) or πιπρω (piprō): a small bird mentioned by Aristotle and other contemporary authors but never identified, associated with neotropical manakins in the genus Pipra, and ιτης (itēs): "similar to", meaning in total "similar to Pipra". The species name pileata comes from the Latin pileatus, meaning "capped".

=== Taxonomy ===
The black-capped piprites is monotypic. Its relation to the genus Piprites and other tyranids is uncertain. Molecular genetic studies in the early 2000s demonstrated relationships with Rhynchocyclidae and Tyrannidae. Following these studies, the family Pipritidae was proposed in 2013 with Piprites as the sole genus. The family name was adopted by Avibase and the Brazilian Committee for Ornithological Records, however, the South American Classification Committee (SACC) maintained the genus as incertae sedis and rejected the family name recommendation in 2016. 3 years later, the SACC approved Pipritinae as a subfamily of Tyrannidae.
