= Zernike Institute for Advanced Materials =

Research centre in Groningen, the Netherlands

Logo

The Zernike Institute for Advanced Materials is the department of nanoscience and materials science of the University of Groningen in the Netherlands.

The institute is named after the Dutch Nobel Prize winner Frits Zernike, famous for his development of phase contrast microscopy. The research of the Zernike Institute is focused on curiosity-driven studies of functional materials. The research involve researchers from the fields of physics, chemistry and biology. The aim is to understand how functional materials work at the atomic and molecular level. The Zernike Institute for Advanced Materials is involved in the whole string of research starting from design, through synthesis, device building, characterisation, investigation of the theoretical foundation and feedback to the design process.

The institute is responsible for the education of numerous master and PhD students among others through the top master nanoscience programme.
