= Catarina Dutilh Novaes =

Brazilian and Dutch philosopher

Catarina Dutilh Novaes (2022)

Catarina Dutilh Novaes is a Brazilian and Dutch philosopher whose research concerns the formalization of argumentation and reasoning in the history of logic and the philosophy of logic. She is a professor at Vrije Universiteit Amsterdam in the Netherlands, and a professorial fellow at the Arché philosophical research centre of the University of St Andrews in Scotland.

== Education and career ==
Dutilh Novaes was born in 1976 in São Paulo, Brazil, the daughter of two academics. After an undergraduate degree at the University of São Paulo, she went to the Institute for Logic, Language and Computation at the University of Amsterdam for a master's degree in logic. Staying in the Netherlands, she earned a Ph.D. in 2006 at Leiden University, with the dissertation Formalizations après la lettre : studies in Medieval logic and semantics promoted by Göran Sundholm.

After postdoctoral research at the CUNY Graduate Center in New York, she returned to the Netherlands as a researcher at the Institute for Logic, Language and Computation. She took a position at the University of Groningen in 2011, initially as an assistant professor and Rosalind Franklin Fellow and later as a full professor. She moved to her current position in the Faculty of Humanities, Reasoning and Argumentation at Vrije Universiteit Amsterdam in 2018. Since 2019, she also visits the Arché philosophical research centre of the University of St Andrews as a professorial fellow.

== Recognition ==
Dutilh Novaes was elected to the Royal Netherlands Academy of Arts and Sciences in 2022. In the same year, her book The Dialogical Roots of Deduction won the Lakatos Award.

== Books ==
Dutilh Novaes is the author of books including:

- Formalizing Medieval Logical Theories: Suppositio, Consequentiae and Obligationes (Springer, 2007)
- Formal Languages in Logic: A Philosophical and Cognitive Analysis (Cambridge University Press, 2012)
- The Dialogical Roots of Deduction: Historical, Cognitive, and Philosophical Perspectives on Reasoning (Cambridge University Press, 2020).

She is also an editor of:

- Insolubles and Consequences: Essays in Honour of Stephen Read (with Ole Thomassen Hjortland, College Publications, 2012)
- The Cambridge Companion to Medieval Logic (with Stephen Read, Cambridge University Press, 2016).
