= Functional Materials =

- Discipline: Materials Science
- Language: English
- Edited by: Volodymyr Semynozhenko

Publication details
- History: 1994-present
- Publisher: Institute for Single Crystals of the National Academy of Sciences of Ukraine (Ukraine)
- Frequency: Quarterly

Standard abbreviations
- ISO 4: Funct. Mater.

Indexing
- ISSN: 1027-5495

Links
- Journal homepage

Functional Materials is a quarterly peer-reviewed scientific journal published by the Institute for Single Crystals of the National Academy of Sciences of Ukraine. The journal was established in 1994 and covers fundamental and applied research on organic and non-organic functional materials. Functional Materials has been included in the list of scientific journals recognized by the Higher Attestation Commission of Ukraine.
