= Physical neural network =

Type of artificial neural network

A physical neural network is a type of artificial neural network in which an electrically adjustable material is used to emulate the function of a neural synapse or a higher-order (dendritic) neuron model. "Physical" neural network is used to emphasize the reliance on physical hardware used to emulate neurons as opposed to software-based approaches. More generally the term is applicable to other artificial neural networks in which a memristor or other electrically adjustable resistance material is used to emulate a neural synapse.

== Types of physical neural networks ==
=== ADALINE ===
In the 1960s Bernard Widrow and Ted Hoff developed ADALINE (Adaptive Linear Neuron) which used electrochemical cells called memistors (memory resistors) to emulate synapses of an artificial neuron. The memistors were implemented as 3-terminal devices operating based on the reversible electroplating of copper such that the resistance between two of the terminals is controlled by the integral of the current applied via the third terminal. The ADALINE circuitry was briefly commercialized by the Memistor Corporation in the 1960s enabling some applications in pattern recognition. However, since the memistors were not fabricated using integrated circuit fabrication techniques the technology was not scalable and was eventually abandoned as solid-state electronics became mature.

=== Analog VLSI ===
In 1989 Carver Mead published his book Analog VLSI and Neural Systems, which spun off perhaps the most common variant of analog neural networks. The physical realization is implemented in analog VLSI. This is often implemented as field effect transistors in low inversion. Such devices can be modelled as translinear circuits. This is a technique described by Barrie Gilbert in several papers around mid 1970th, and in particular his Translinear Circuits from 1981. With this method circuits can be analyzed as a set of well-defined functions in steady-state, and such circuits assembled into complex networks.

Recent neuromorphic implementations of analog VLSI-based physical neural networks include the NeuroGrid, BrainScale-S2, and DYNAP-SE systems. Classically, these systems use analog circuits to implement the neuron and synapse models in combination with digital communication for spike transmission. These neuromorphic physical networks can be trained to solve tasks similar to other artificial neural networks using spike-timing dependent plasticity on chip, surrogate backpropagation with a computer in the loop or brain-inspired feedback control algorithms.

=== Physical Neural Network ===
Alex Nugent describes a physical neural network as one or more nonlinear neuron-like nodes used to sum signals and nanoconnections formed from nanoparticles, nanowires, or nanotubes which determine the signal strength input to the nodes. Alignment or self-assembly of the nanoconnections is determined by the history of the applied electric field performing a function analogous to neural synapses. Numerous applications for such physical neural networks are possible. For example, a temporal summation device can be composed of one or more nanoconnections having an input and an output thereof, wherein an input signal provided to the input causes one or more of the nanoconnection to experience an increase in connection strength thereof over time. Another example of a physical neural network is taught by U.S. Patent No. 7,039,619 entitled "Utilized nanotechnology apparatus using a neural network, a solution and a connection gap," which issued to Alex Nugent by the U.S. Patent & Trademark Office on May 2, 2006.

A further application of physical neural network is shown in U.S. Patent No. 7,412,428 entitled "Application of hebbian and anti-hebbian learning to nanotechnology-based physical neural networks," which issued on August 12, 2008.

Nugent and Molter have shown that universal computing and general-purpose machine learning are possible from operations available through simple memristive circuits operating the AHaH plasticity rule. More recently, it has been argued that also complex networks of purely memristive circuits can serve as neural networks.

=== Phase change neural network ===
In 2002, Stanford Ovshinsky described an analog neural computing medium in which phase-change material has the ability to cumulatively respond to multiple input signals. An electrical alteration of the resistance of the phase change material is used to control the weighting of the input signals.

=== Memristive neural network ===
Greg Snider of HP Labs describes a system of cortical computing with memristive nanodevices. The memristors (memory resistors) are implemented by thin film materials in which the resistance is electrically tuned via the transport of ions or oxygen vacancies within the film. DARPA's SyNAPSE project has funded IBM Research and HP Labs, in collaboration with the Boston University Department of Cognitive and Neural Systems (CNS), to develop neuromorphic architectures which may be based on memristive systems.

=== Protonic artificial synapses ===
In 2022, researchers reported the development of nanoscale brain-inspired artificial synapses, using the ion proton (H^{+}), for 'analog deep learning'.

== See also ==
- AI accelerator
- Brain simulation
- Neuromorphic engineering
- Optical neural network
- Quantum neural network
