= Yinyu =

Yinyu may refer to:

- Yinyu Ye, an American theoretical computer scientist
- A number of Chinese fish dishes including egg - for example:
  - yínyú jiāndàn (Silver Fish Fried Egg)
  - yínyú chǎodàn (Whitebait omelette)
- Yinyu Waterfall in Yushan National Park
- Two islets (Yin Yu & Yinyu Zi) in the Observation Bank of the Crescent Group of the Paracel Islands of the South China Sea
