= Ionic Coulomb blockade =

Electrostatic phenomenon

Ionic Coulomb blockade (ICB) is an electrostatic phenomenon predicted by M. Krems and Massimiliano Di Ventra (UC San Diego) that appears in ionic transport through mesoscopic electro-diffusive systems (artificial nanopores and biological ion channels) and manifests itself as oscillatory dependences of the conductance on the fixed charge $Q_{\rm f}$ in the pore ( or on the external voltage $V$, or on the bulk concentration $c_{\rm b}$).

ICB represents an ion-related counterpart of the better-known electronic Coulomb blockade (ECB) that is observed in quantum dots. Both ICB and ECB arise from quantisation of the electric charge and from an electrostatic exclusion principle and they share in common a number of effects and underlying physical mechanisms. ICB provides some specific effects related to the existence of ions of different charge $q=ze$ (different in both sign and value) where integer $z$ is ion valence and $e$ is the elementary charge, in contrast to the single-valence electrons of ECB ($z=-1$).

ICB effects appear in tiny pores whose self-capacitance $C_{\rm s}$ is so small that the charging energy of a single ion $\Delta E=z^2e^2/(2 C_s)$becomes large compared to the thermal energy per particle ( $\Delta E \gg k_{\rm B}T$). In such cases there is strong quantisation of the energy spectrum inside the pore, and the system may either be "blockaded" against the transportation of ions or, in the opposite extreme, it may show resonant barrier-less conduction, depending on the free energy bias coming from $Q_{\rm f}$, $V$, or $\log{c_{\rm b}}$.

The ICB model claims that $Q_{\rm f}$ is a primary determinant of conduction and selectivity for particular ions, and the predicted oscillations in conductance and an associated Coulomb staircase of channel occupancy vs $Q_{\rm f}$ are expected to be strong effects in the cases of divalent ions ($z=2$) or trivalent ions ($z=3$).

Some effects, now recognised as belonging to ICB, were discovered and considered earlier in precursor papers on electrostatics-governed conduction mechanisms in channels and nanopores.

The manifestations of ICB have been observed in water-filled sub-nanometre pores through a 2D $\ce{MoS2}$ monolayer, revealed by Brownian dynamics (BD) simulations of calcium conductance bands in narrow channels, and account for a diversity of effects seen in biological ion channels. ICB predictions have also been confirmed by a mutation study of divalent blockade in the NaChBac bacterial channel.

== Model ==
=== Generic electrostatic model of channel/nanopore ===
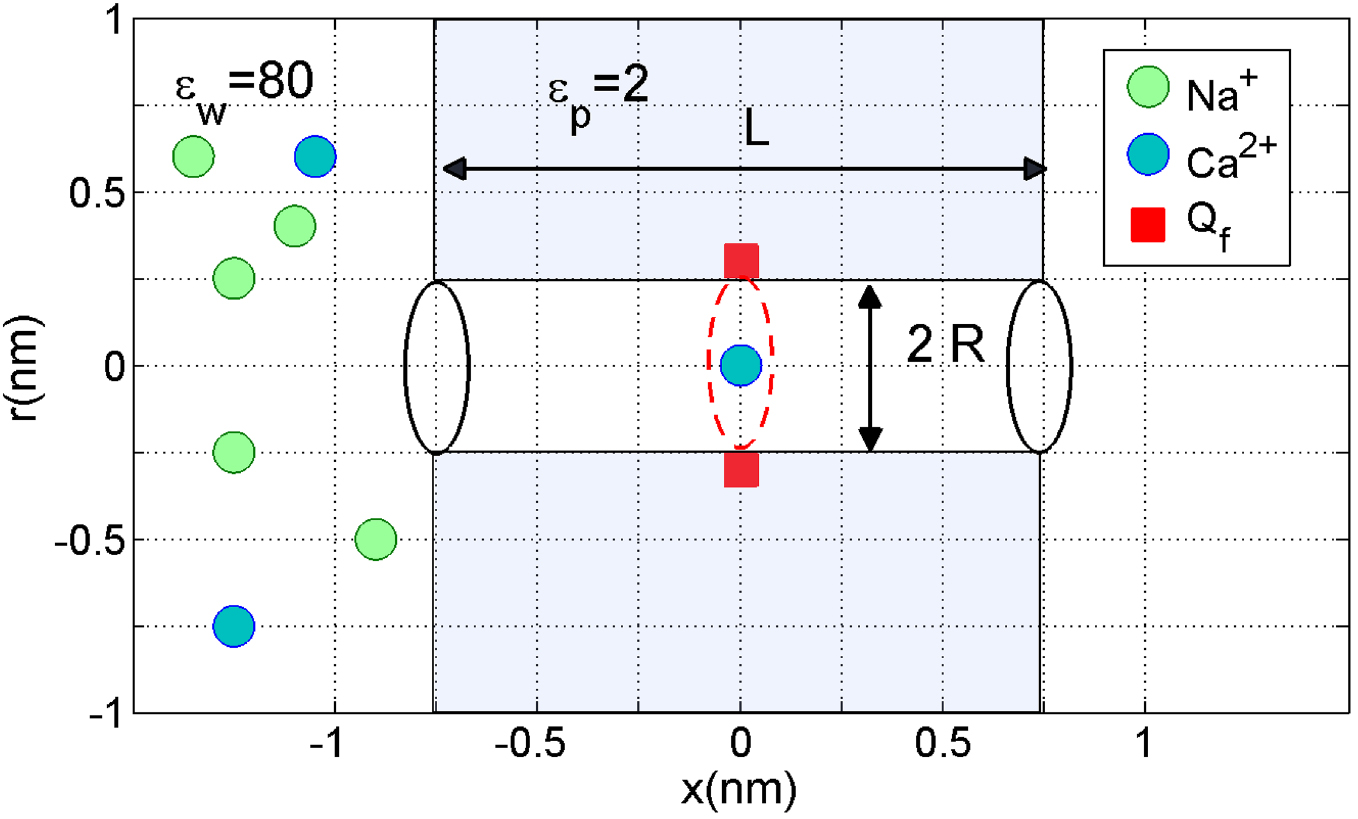
Fig. 1. Generic electrostatic and Brownian dynamics model of a channel or nanopore

ICB effects may be derived on the basis of a simplified electrostatics/Brownian dynamics model of a nanopore or of the selectivity filter of an ion channel. The model represents the channel/pore as a charged hole through a water-filled protein hub embedded in the membrane. Its fixed charge $Q_{\rm f}$ is considered as a uniform, centrally placed, rigid ring (Fig.1). The channel is assumed to have geometrical parameters length $L\approx1$nm and radius $R\approx 0.3-0.5$nm, allowing for the single-file movement of partially hydrated ions.

The model represents the water and protein as continuous media with dielectric constants $\varepsilon_{\rm w}=80$ and $\varepsilon_{\rm p}=2-10$ respectively. The mobile ions are described as discrete entities with valence $z$ and of radius $R_{\rm ion}$, moving stochastically through the pore, governed by the self-consistently coupled Poisson's electrostatic equation and Langevin stochastic equation.

The model is applicable to both cationic and anionic biological ion channels and to artificial nanopores.

=== Electrostatics ===
The mobile ion is assumed to be partially hydrated (typically retaining its first hydration shell) and carrying charge $q=ze$ where $e$ is the elementary charge (e.g. the $\text{Ca}^{2+}$ ion with $z=2$). The model allows one to derive the pore and ion parameters satisfying the barrier-less permeation conditions, and to do so from basic electrostatics taking account of charge quantisation.

The potential energy $E_n$ of a channel/pore containing $n$ ions can be decomposed into electrostatic energy$E_{n}^{\rm ES}$ , dehydration energy, $E_n^{\rm DH}$ and ion-ion local interaction energy $E_n^{\rm INT}$:
$$E_n=E_n^{\rm ES}+E_n^{\rm DH}+E_n^{\rm INT}...(E_n \text{ Decomposition})$$
The basic ICB model makes the simplifying approximation that $E_n=E_n^{ES}$, whence:
$$\begin{align} Q_n & =  z e n+Q_{\rm f} &\text{(Excess charge)}\\ E_n&=\dfrac{Q_n^2}{2C_s} &\text{(Electrostatic energy)} \\
C_s& = 4\pi \epsilon_0 \epsilon_w \dfrac{R^2}{L} &\text{(Self-capacitance)}
\end{align}$$
where $Q_{n}$ is the net charge of the pore when it contains $n$ identical ions of valence $z$, the sign of the moving ions being opposite to that of the $Q_{\rm f}$, $C_{\rm s}$ represents the electrostatic self-capacitance of the pore, and $\epsilon_0$ is the electric permittivity of the vacuum.

=== Resonant barrier-less conduction ===
Fig.2. Resonant barrier-less conduction of $\ce{Ca^{2+}}$ions, with energies $E$ plotted vertically. (a) Plot of $\mu_{\rm ex}$as a function of fixed charge $Q_{\rm f}/e$ and position $x$ in the channel. At the "resonant" value of $Q_{\rm f}/e=1$ the transition is almost barrier-less (red cross-section). (b) Plots of $\Delta E$ (blue curve) and $E_{\rm AFF}$ (dashed-green) and their sum $\mu_{\rm ex}$ (red) against $x$ for $Q_{\rm f}/e=1$, showing that barrier-less conduction originates in a near-cancellation between $\Delta E$ and $E_{\rm AFF}$.

Thermodynamics and statistical mechanics describe systems that have variable numbers of particles via the chemical potential $\mu$, defined as Gibbs free energy $G$ per particle:
$$\begin{align}
G_n&=E_n-TS_n & \text{(Gibbs free energy)}\\
\mu_n&=G_{n+1}-G_n &\text{(Chemical potential)}
\end{align}$$
, where $G_n$ is the Gibbs free energy for the system of $n$ particles. In thermal and particle equilibrium with bulk reservoirs, the entire system has a common value of chemical potential $\mu=\mu_F$ (the Fermi level in other contexts). The free energy needed for the entry of a new ion to the channel is defined by the excess chemical potential $\mu_{\rm ex}=\mu_n-\mu_F$ which (ignoring an entropy term ) can be written as
$$\begin{align}
\mu_{\rm ex}&=E_{n+1}-E_n=\Delta E+E_{\rm AFF} &\text{(Coulomb gap)}\\
\Delta E&=\frac{z^2 e^2}{2 C_s}; &\text{(Charging energy)}\\
E_{\rm AFF}&=\frac{z e}{C_s}(zen+Q_{\rm f}) &\text{(Affinity energy)}
\end{align}$$
where $\Delta E$ is the charging energy (self-energy barrier) of an incoming ion and $E_{\rm AFF}$is its affinity (i.e. energy of attraction to the binding site $Q_{\rm f}$). The difference in energy between $\Delta E$ and $\Delta E_{\rm AFF}$ (Fig.2.) defines the ionic energy level separation (Coulomb gap) and gives rise to most of the observed ICB effects.

In selective ion channels, the favoured ionic species passes through the channel almost at the rate of free diffusion, despite the strong affinity to the binding site. This conductivity-selectivity paradox has been explained as being a consequence of selective barrier-less conduction. In the ICB model, this occurs when $\Delta E$ is almost exactly balanced by $E_{\rm AFF}$ ($\mu_{\rm ex}\approx0$), which happens for a particular value of $Q_{\rm f}$ (Fig.2.). This resonant value of $Q_{\rm f}$ depends on the ionic properties $z$ and $R_{\rm ion}$ (implicitly, via the $R_{\rm ion}$-dependent dehydration energy), thereby providing a basis for selectivity.

=== Oscillations of conductance ===
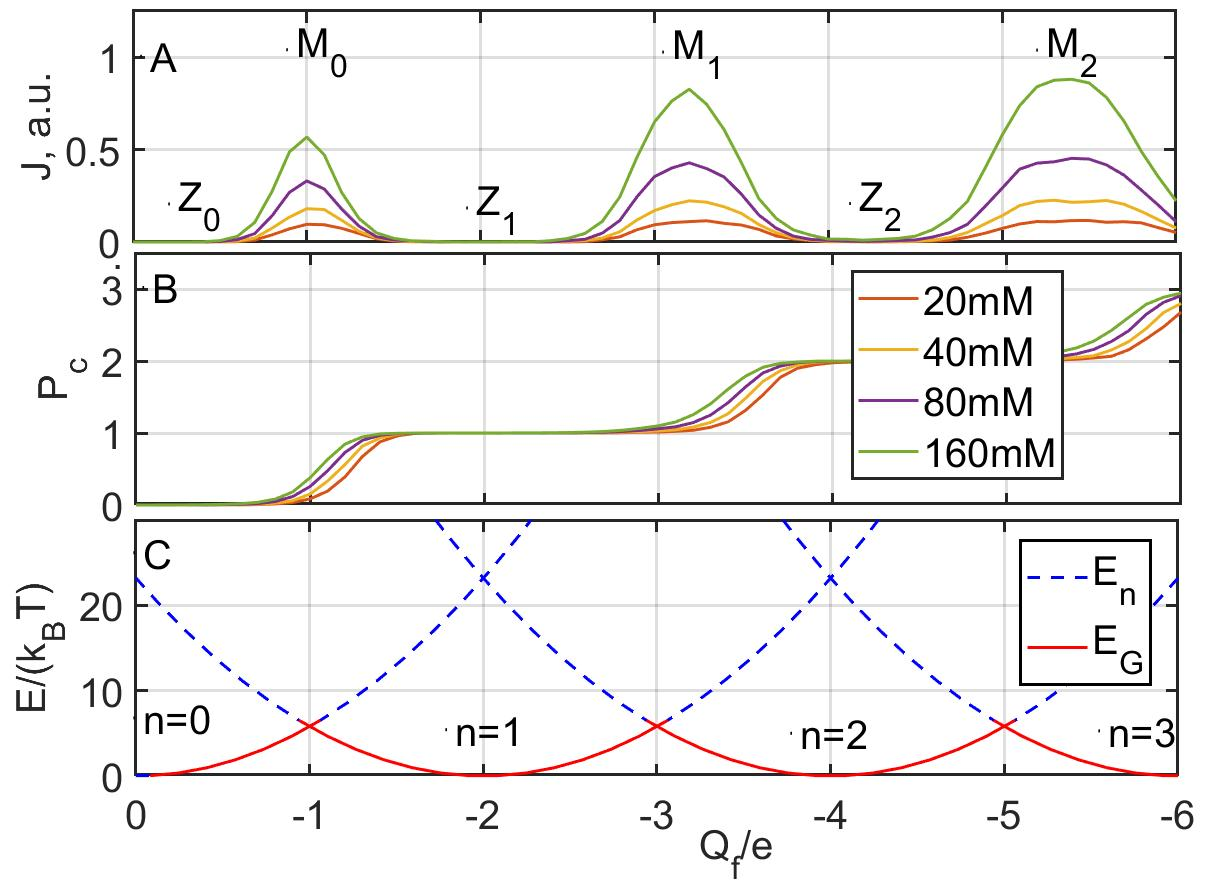
Fig.3. Ionic Coulomb blockade illustrated by BD-simulations of Ca$^{2+}$ conduction, as the fixed charge $Q_{\rm f}$ is varied: (a) Ca$^{2+}$ conduction bands; (b) Ca$^{2+}$ occupancy, forming a Coulomb staircase; and (c) Ground state energy (red)

The ICB model explicitly predicts an oscillatory dependence of conduction on $Q_{\rm f}$, with two interlaced sets of singularities associated with a sequentially increasing number of ions $n=1,2,3,...$ in the channel (Fig.3A).

Electrostatic blockade points $Z_n$ correspond to minima in the ground state energy of the pore (Fig.3C).
$$E_{\rm G}(Q_{\rm f}) =\min_n{E_n(Q_{\rm f})} \quad \quad \text{(Ground state})$$
The $Z_n$ points ($\partial E_n/\partial Q_{\rm f}=0$) are equivalent to neutralisation points where $Q_{n}=0$.

Resonant conduction points $M_n$ correspond to the barrier-less condition: $\mu_{\rm ex} =0$, or $\Delta E\approx-E_{\rm AFF}$.

The values of $Z_n \text{ and } M_n$ are given by the simple formulae
$$\begin{align}Z_n&=-z e n &\text{(Electrostatic blockade)} \\
M_n&=-z e (n+1/2)  &\text{(Resonant conduction)},
\end{align}$$
i.e. the period of conductance oscillations in $Q_{\rm f}$, $\Delta=|M_{n+1}-M_n|=|Z_{n+1}-Z_n|=|ze|$.

For $z=2$, in a typical ion channel geometry, $\Delta E/(k_{\rm B}T) \approx 20 \gg 1$, and ICB becomes strong. Consequently, plots of the BD-simulated $\ce{Ca^2+}$current $J$ vs $Q_{\rm f}$ exhibit multi-ion conduction bands - strong Coulomb blockade oscillations between minima $Z_n$and maxima $M_n$(Fig.3A)).

The point $Z_0=0$ corresponds to an uncharged pore with $Q_{\rm f}=0$. Such pores are blockaded for ions of either sign.

=== Coulomb staircase ===
The ICB oscillations in conductance correspond to a Coulomb staircase in the pore occupancy $P_{\rm c}$, with transition regions corresponding to $M_n$ and saturation regions corresponding to $Z_n$ (Fig.3B) . The shape of the staircase is described by the Fermi-Dirac (FD) distribution, similarly to the Coulomb staircases of quantum dots. Thus, for the $0 \rightarrow 1$ transition, the FD function is:
$$\begin{align}
P_{\rm c}&=\left[1+\dfrac{1}{P_{\rm b}}\exp\left(\dfrac{\mu_{\rm ex}}{k_{\rm B}T}\right)\right]^{-1};  &\text{(Fermi-Dirac distribution)}\\
\mu_{\rm ex}&=\frac{z e}{C_s}\left( Q_{\rm f}-M_0\right).
\end{align}$$
Here $\mu_{\rm ex}$ is the excess chemical potential for the particular ion and $P_{\rm b}$ is an equivalent bulk occupancy related to pore volume. The saturated FD statistics of occupancy is equivalent to the Langmuir isotherm or to Michaelis–Menten kinetics.

It is the factor $1/P_{\rm b}$ that gives rise to the concentration-related shift in the staircase seen in Fig.3B.

=== Shift of singular points ===
Addition of the partial excess chemical potentials $\mu_{\rm ex}^Y$ coming from different sources $Y$(including dehydration, local binding, volume exclusion etc.) leads to the ICB barrier-less condition $\mu_{\rm ex}=0$ leads to a proper shift in the ICB resonant points $M_n$, described by a "shift equation" :
$$\Delta M_n= -\dfrac{C_s}{z e} \sum_Y{\mu_{\rm ex}^{Y}} \quad \quad \text{(Shift equation)}$$
i.e. the additional energy contributions $\mu_{\rm ex}^Y$ lead to shifts in the resonant barrier-less point $M_0$.

The more important of these shifts (excess potentials) are:

- A concentration-related shift $\mu_{\rm ex}^{\rm ES}=-k_{\rm B}T\log(P_{\rm b})$ arising from the bulk entropy
- A dehydration-related shift $\mu_{\rm ex}^{\rm DH}$, arising from partial dehydration penalty
- A local binding-related shift $\mu_{\rm ex}^{\rm INT}$, coming from energy of local binding and surface effects.

== In artificial nanopores ==
=== Sub-nm MoS_{2} pores ===
Following its prediction based on analytic theory and molecular dynamics simulations, experimental evidence for ICB emerged from experiments on monolayer $\ce{MoS2}$ pierced by a single $0.6$nm nanopore. Highly non-Ohmic conduction was observed between aqueous ionic solutions on either side of the membrane. In particular, for low voltages across the membrane, the current remained close to zero, but it rose abruptly when a threshold of about $400$mV was exceeded. This was interpreted as complete ionic Coulomb blockade of current in the (uncharged) nanopore due to the large potential barrier at low voltages. But the application of larger voltages pulled the barrier down, producing accessible states into which transitions could occur, thus leading to conduction.

== In biological ion channels ==
The realisation that ICB could occur in biological ion channels accounted for several experimentally observed features of selectivity, including:

=== Valence selectivity ===
Valence selectivity is the channel's ability to discriminate between ions of different valence $z$, wherein e.g. a calcium channel favours $\text{Ca}^{2+}$ ions over $\text{Na}^{+}$ ions by a factor of up to 1000×. Valence selectivity has been attributed variously to pure electrostatics, or to a charge space competition mechanism, or to a snug fit of the ion to ligands, or to quantised dehydration. In the ICB model, valence selectivity arises from electrostatics, namely from $z$-dependence of the value of $Q_{\rm f}=M_n=-ze(n+1/2)$ needed to provide for barrier-less conduction.

Correspondingly, the ICB model provides explanations of why site-directed mutations that alter $Q_{\rm f}$ can destroy the channel by blockading it, or can alter its selectivity from favouring $\text{Ca}^{2+}$ ions to favouring $\text{Na}^{+}$ ions, or vice versa .

=== Divalent blockade ===
Divalent (e.g. $\text{Ca}^{2+}$) blockade of monovalent (e.g. $\text{Na}^{+}$) currents is observed in some types of ion channels. Namely, $\text{Na}^{+}$ ions in a pure sodium solution pass unimpeded through a calcium channel, but are blocked by tiny (nM) extracellular concentrations of $\text{Ca}^{2+}$ ions. ICB provides a transparent explanation of both the phenomenon itself and of the Langmuir-isotherm-shape of the current vs. $\log[\text{Ca}^{2+}]$ attenuation curve, deriving them from the strong affinity and an FD distribution of $\ce{Ca^2+}$ions. Vice versa, appearance divalent blockade presents strong evidence in favour of ICB

Similarly, ICB can account for the divalent (Iodide $\ce{I^2-}$) blockade that has been observed in biological chloride ($\ce{Cl-}$)-selective channels.

== Special features ==
=== Comparisons between ICB and ECB ===
ICB and ECB should be considered as two versions of the same fundamental electrostatic phenomenon. Both ICB and ECB are based on charge quantisation and on the finite single-particle charging energy $\Delta E$, resulting in close similarity of the governing equations and manifestations of these closely related phenomena. Nonetheless, there are important distinctions between ICB and ECB: their similarities and differences are summarised in Table 1.

Table 1. Comparison between ICB and ECB
| Property | ICB | ECB |
|---|---|---|
| Mobile charge carriers | cations ($\text{Na}^+, \text{K}^+, \text{Ca}^{2+},$ etc...), anions ($\text{Cl}^-, \text{I}^{2-},$ etc.) | electrons ($e^-$) |
| Valence of mobile charge carriers, $z$ | positive (+1, +2, +3,...), negative (-1, -2...) | $z=-1$ |
| Transport engine | Classical diffusion | QM tunneling |
| Conductance oscillations | Yes, valence dependent | Yes |
| Coulomb staircase for occupancy, $P_c$ | Yes, FD-shaped | Yes, FD-shaped |

=== Particular cases ===
Coulomb blockade can also appear in superconductors; in such a case the free charge carriers are Cooper pairs ($z=-2$)

In addition, Pauli spin blockade represents a special kind of Coulomb blockade, connected with Pauli exclusion principle.

=== Quantum analogies ===
Despite appearing in completely classical systems, ICB exhibits some phenomena reminiscent of quantum-mechanics (QM). They arise because the charge/entity discreteness of the ions leads to quantisation of the energy $\Delta E$ spectrum and hence to the QM-analogies:

- Noise-driven diffusive motion provides for escape over barriers, comparable to QM-tunnelling in ECB.
- The particular FD shape of the $\text {Ca}^{2+}$ occupancy vs $\log{[\text{Ca}^{2+}]}$ plays a significant role in the ICB explanation of the divalent blockade phenomenon. The appearance of an FD distribution in the diffusion of classical particles obeying an exclusion principle, has been demonstrated rigorously.

== See also ==
- Coulomb blockade
- Ion channel
- Brownian dynamics
- Nanopore
- Binding selectivity
- Fermi–Dirac statistics
- Electrostatics
- Quantisation of charge
- Elementary charge
