= Exclusion principle =

Exclusion principle may refer to:

- Exclusion principle (philosophy), epistemological principle
- In economics, the exclusion principle states "the owner of a private good may exclude others from use unless they pay."; it excludes those who are unwilling or unable to pay for the private good, but does not apply to public goods that are known to be indivisible: such goods need only to be available to obtain their benefits rather than purchased
- Pauli exclusion principle, quantum mechanical principle
- In ecology, the competitive exclusion principle, sometimes referred to as Gause's law, is a proposition that two species which compete for the same limited resource cannot coexist at constant population values

== See also ==
- Exclusionary rule, legal principle
- Inclusion–exclusion principle, in combinatorial mathematics
