= Massimiliano Di Ventra =

American-Italian theoretical physicist

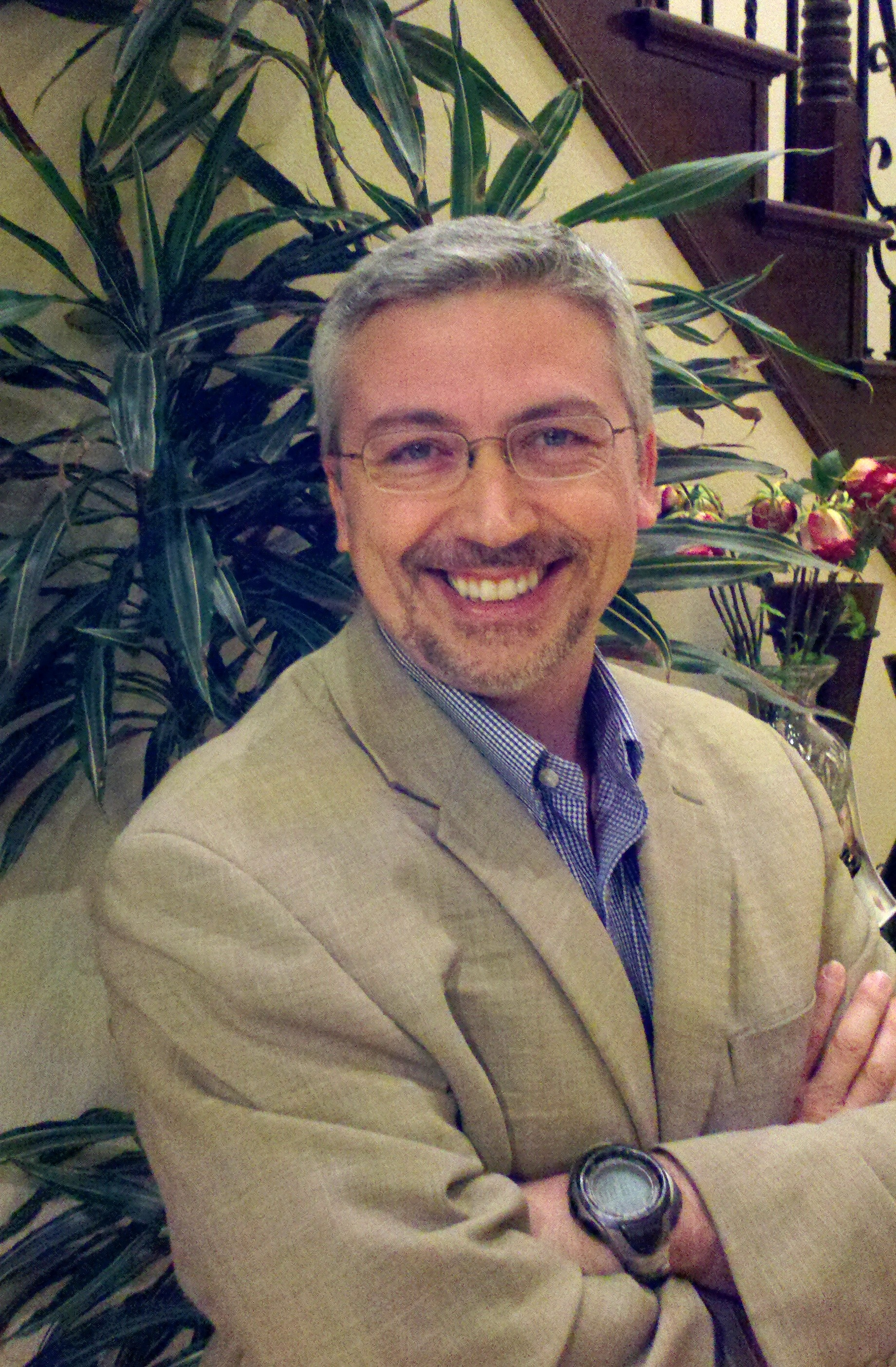
- Education: EPFL
- Known for: Transport in nanoscale systems; DNA sequencing by tunneling; Ionic Coulomb blockade; MemComputing; memristors; memcapacitors; meminductors; Stochastic density functional theory
- Awards: NSF Early CAREER Award; Humboldt Research Award; 2020 Feynman prize for Theory; IEEE Nanotechnology Council Distinguished Lecturer; AAAS Fellow; APS Fellow; IEEE Fellow; FInstP; Member Academia Europaea
- Scientific career
- Fields: Physics, Nanotechnology
- Workplaces: UCSD

Massimiliano Di Ventra is an American-Italian theoretical physicist. Specializing in condensed-matter physics, he is the co-founder of MemComputing, Inc.

== Education ==
Di Ventra obtained his undergraduate degree in physics summa cum laude from the University of Trieste (Italy) in 1991 and did his PhD studies at the École Polytechnique Fédérale de Lausanne (Switzerland) in 1993–1997.

== Career ==
He was a visiting scientist at the IBM T.J. Watson Research Center and a research assistant professor at Vanderbilt University before joining the physics department of Virginia Tech in 2000 as assistant professor. He was promoted to associate professor in 2003. In 2004, he moved to the physics department of the University of California, San Diego, where he was promoted to full professor in 2006.

In 2022, Di Ventra was accused of retaliation by a striking graduate student worker in his lab as he gave the student a "U" (unsatisfactory) grade. In response, Di Ventra said he did not threaten the student and that the grade related to the student's lack of performance in classes, saying: "it's a student class, it's not related to the strike". After reaching its agreement, the union agreed to drop all charges of unfair labor practices.

=== Research ===
Di Ventra has published more than 200 papers in refereed journals (he was named 2018 Highly Cited Researcher by Clarivate Analytics) and has 7 granted patents (3 foreign). He is the co-founder of MemComputing, Inc.

Di Ventra has made several contributions to condensed-matter physics, especially quantum transport in atomic and nanoscale systems, non-equilibrium statistical mechanics of many-body systems, DNA sequencing by tunneling, and memelements.

He suggested the MemComputing paradigm of computation, and with his group and collaborators he derived various analytical properties of memristive networks, including the Caravelli–Traversa–Di Ventra equation, an exact equation for the evolution of the internal memory in a network of memristive devices.

== Books ==
- M. Di Ventra and Y.V. Pershin, Memristors and Memelements: Mathematics, Physics, and Fiction (Springer, 2023).
- M. Di Ventra, MemComputing: Fundamentals and Applications (Oxford University Press, 2022).
- M. Di Ventra, The Scientific Method: Reflections from a Practitioner (Oxford University Press, 2018).
- M. Di Ventra, Electrical Transport in Nanoscale Systems (Cambridge University Press, 2008).
- M. Di Ventra, S. Evoy, J.R. Heflin, eds., Introduction to Nanoscale Science and Technology (Springer, 2004).
