= Aditi Sahu =

Indian skin cancer researcher

Aditi Sahu is a senior research scientist at the Memorial Sloan Kettering Cancer Center (MSK) in New York City. Her research focuses on non-invasive imaging technologies for diagnosing skin cancers and research on tumor microenvironments. She has authored peer-reviewed research articles and has received multiple research awards in dermatology and optics engineering.

== Early life and education ==
After completing her PhD studies, she joined the Memorial Sloan Kettering Cancer Center (MSK) as a postdoctoral researcher in 2017.

== Career ==
At MSK, Sahu has conducted research on advanced optical imaging techniques, including reflectance confocal microscopy and other high-resolution modalities, related to the detection and characterization of skin cancers Her work on tumor microenvironments in skin cancers was published in the scientific journal Nature Communications. Her research on optical coherence tomography has been published in the Journal of Biomedical Optics and Journal of Nuclear Imaging.

In 2019 and 2021, projects for which she was principal investigator received Dermatology Fellowship awards from the Melanoma Research Alliance. She was awarded the Ashley Trenner Research Grant Award by the Skin Cancer Foundation, based in the United States, in October 2022.

In 2025, she co-authored a publication on in vivo vascular biology imaging using super-high magnification dermatoscopy techniques.

== Awards ==
Sahu received the Best Translational Research award from the Society of Optics and Photonics at the SPIE Photonics West Conference in San Francisco. In 2018 and 2025, she earned a full scholarship for the Women in Photonics Workshop in Germany, organized by IPHT Jena.
