= Heidemarie Schmidt =

German physicist

- Education: Leipzig University
- Scientific career
- Workplaces: Chemnitz University of Technology; Helmholtz-Zentrum Dresden-Rossendorf; Leipzig University; IPHT Jena
- Thesis: Semiconductor based spintronics using ZnO thin films (postdoc) (1999)

Heidemarie Schmidt is a professor at the Leibniz Institute of Photonic Technology. Her research considers quantum detection and the development of new detector systems that can characterise systems at the quantum limit. She has contributed to the field of neuromorphic computing, and proposed new computing architectures based on memristive devices.

== Early life and education ==
Schmidt was born in Germany. She studied physics at Leipzig University, where she developed strategies to measure the bandwidths of ultrathin III-V semiconductors. She remained in Leipzig for her postdoc, where she worked on spintronics using ZnO.

== Research and career ==
In 2003 Schmidt established a research group on nano-spintronics at Leipzig University. She moved to the Helmholtz-Zentrum Dresden-Rossendorf in 2007, where she spent five years. In 2012 the German Research Foundation awarded Schmidt a Fraunhofer Attract fellowship, which she held at the Chemnitz University of Technology. Here she started working on memresistive devices for edge analytics and secure electronics. She demonstrated an analogue memristor based on BiFeO_{3} and a digital memristor based on YMnO_{3}.

She joined the Leibniz Institute of Photonic Technology (IPHT Jena) in 2017. Schmidt develops new detectors for understanding quantum phenomena. She works on both cooled and uncooled spatial and temporal sensors that can detect in the Terahertz and infrared region. To achieve this sensing, Schmidt uses micro- and nanotechnologies. She has developed memristors for use in cryogenic environments, such as those found in quantum technologies, and for space missions. Her memristors are modelled on neural circuitry, and can certifiably (transparently, repeatably and honestly) perform calculations – and store the results. In 2023 she founded MemLog, which provides new electronic components for neuromorphic computing architecture.

== Select publications ==
- Qingyu Xu; Heidemarie Schmidt; Shengqiang Zhou; et al. (25 February 2008). "Room temperature ferromagnetism in ZnO films due to defects". Applied Physics Letters. 92 (8): 082508. doi:10.1063/1.2885730. ISSN 0003-6951. Wikidata Q62394509.
- Sylvain Saïghi; Christian G Mayr; María Teresa Serrano Gotarredona; et al. (2 March 2015). "Plasticity in memristive devices for spiking neural networks". Frontiers in Neuroscience. 9: 51. doi:10.3389/fnins.2015.00051. ISSN 1662-453X. PMC 4345885. PMID 25784849. Wikidata Q28085560.
- Shengqiang Zhou; Qingyu Xu; Kay Potzger; et al. (8 December 2008). "Room temperature ferromagnetism in carbon-implanted ZnO". Applied Physics Letters. 93 (23): 232507. arXiv:0811.3487. doi:10.1063/1.3048076. ISSN 0003-6951. Wikidata Q62394510.
