= Jennifer Rupp =

German-American professor

Jennifer Lilia Marguerite Rupp FRSC
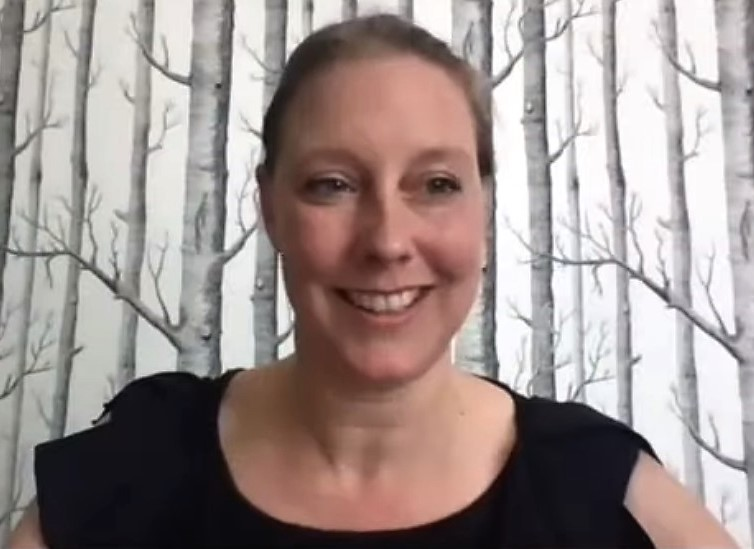
- Rupp speaks to the Stanford StorageX Symposium in 2021
- Born: January 27, 1980 (age 46)
- Education: University of Vienna (MS); ETH Zurich (PhD)
- Scientific career
- Fields: Energy Storage & Conversion; Battery; Material Science; Neuromorphic Computing
- Workplaces: Technical University of Munich; MIT; National Institute for Materials Science; ETH Zurich
- Doctoral advisor: Ludwig Gauckler
- Website: https://ecm-tum.de

Jennifer L. M. Rupp FRSC (born January 27, 1980) is a material scientist and professor at the Technical University of Munich, visiting professor at the Massachusetts Institute of Technology and the CTO for battery research at TUM International Energy Research. Rupp has published more than 130 papers in peer reviewed journals, co-authored 7 book chapters and holds more than 25 patents. Rupp research broadly encompasses solid state materials and cell designs for sustainable batteries, energy conversion and neuromorphic memory and computing.

== Early life ==
Rupp was born in Germany in 1980 and grew up from her youth years in Vienna Austria. Her mother is a language teacher and her father is a physicist, the family is mixed French-German-Italian. She played competitive piano as a child and struggled to choose between pursuing her love for music and natural sciences. Rupp was active in her teen years in an environmental chemistry group and also an Austrian team member competing internationally at the International Young Physicist Team in 1998.

== Education ==
Rupp received a Master of Natural Science Degree at the University of Vienna followed by a doctoral degree at ETH Zurich. Her undergraduate efforts were recognised by the Austrian Chemical Society, who presented her with their prize for her diploma thesis. She was awarded the ETH Zurich medal for PhD excellence for her thesis on micro-Solid Oxide Fuel Cells and functional ceramic materials under the supervision of Ludwig Gauckler at ETH Zurich.

== Career ==
Rupp was appointed a postdoc and group leader working at ETH Zurich till 2010, where she studied solid state ionic conductors and conceptualized on micro-solid-oxide fuel cell devices. In 2011 she joined the National Institute for Materials Science in Tsukuba Japan, where she learned how to make oxide memristors for non-volatile memory concepts and protonic fuel cells. She left early as a consequence of the Fukushima Daiichi nuclear disaster and relocated in 2011 with her family to the USA where she joined as a senior scientist the Massachusetts Institute of Technology. In 2012 she was awarded a prestigious Swiss National Science Foundation professorship career grant as a non-tenure track professor at ETH Zurich intensifying her research on memristive effects and starting also on solar-to-fuel conversion materials. In 2015 she received the ERC Starting grant (backed up in this year by SNSF) as a 2nd career grant to foster more research on materials for neuromorphic computing and memories. Short after in 2017, Rupp joined as a faculty at Massachusetts Institute of Technology, where she went through the promotion from assistant to associate professor. At MIT her prime appointment was in the department of material science and engineering and she was also appointed at the electrical engineering and computer science department. In her research at MIT, she focussed intensively with her team on solid state batteries, electroceramics and the concept of Lithionics to use Li-ions beyond batteries in solids state devices to neuromorphically compute, sense or react on optical stimulation.

In fall 2021, Rupp joined as professor at Technical University of Munich keeping an appointment as visiting professor at Massachusetts Institute of Technology, as well as accepting the roles of new CTO for battery research at TUM International Energy Research. In 2023, she Co-Founded and serves as CSO of QKera GmbH, a German solid electrolyte material producer targeting inexpensive, sinter-free, low CO_{2} footprint solid chemistries.

Rupp serves on various advisory boards of companies with businesses on batteries or electroceramic manufacture, is an appointed Academic Director at the TUM Venture Labs to support rapid tech transfer, and is an elected Advisory Board Member of academic journals like Energy & Environmental Science, Advanced Energy Materials, Advanced Functional Materials and others. Since 2017, she is a multiple-times reelected Associate Editor at the Journal of Materials Chemistry A.

In 2019, she founded the LILA Mentorship program for Minorities in Engineering and Sciences in an effort to bridge the ever-existing gender gap, support minority groups and foster diversity in future leadership in energy and solid-state chemistry/material R&D.

Battery research

Rupp is developing next-generation batteries for application in electric vehicles and portable electronics, focusing on novel material synthesis and cell designs. Her research contributes to safer Li-conducting solid-electrolyte alternatives to classic polymers for lithium-ion solid and hybrid batteries by pioneering innovative solid-state synthesis chemistries like the sequential deposition synthesis in collaboration with Samsung, effects and structure science. She has also made major contributions in developing battery ceramic synthesis routes for thin electrolyte compounds, contribute to interface engineering electrode-electrode designs and structural design of various electrolyte and electrode chemistries. She talks about battery research in the Battery generation Podcast, which reaches ++105000 times watches in short time.

Lithionic research

In her Lithionic research, she has developed one of the key papers discussing structure-property requirements of Li-based solid state materials to execute Lithionic functions to neuromorphically compute, sense or react on optical stimuli beyond battery applications. The work lead to a larger research consortium funded by Ericsson to foster the tech for 6G at MIT and was initiated and led by Rupp. In the quest of having less materials serving more functions for future devices she contributes with material concepts, chemistry and physical operations to execute additional functions beyond classic energy storage.

Solid state ionics and electronics research & device engineering

The theme of solid state ionics and electronics is deeply centered in Rupp's work. Her objectives are to create tailored solid state materials and electroceramics for energy conversion and storage or information computing. This includes material design and fundamental model experiments on electro-chemo-mechanics for ionic conductors (i.e. with strain modulus) or also recent work with her colleague Harry Tuller (MIT) and students on opto-ionics. Applications of fast ion conductors include fuel cells, sensors, batteries, memristors, or neuromorphic computing chips. Several proof-of-concept devices and electrochemical operation principles stem from Rupp's team such as strained memristors, or recently proposed glucose-converting fuel cell chips for human implants.

Industrial collaboration, support and consultancy

Rupp has collaborated, served as a consultant to or received competitive awards from several companies including BMW, Samsung, Ericsson, Shell, Equinor, Alkegen, Unifrax, SiFab, Sensirion, Eni, Merck, BASF, Volkswagen, Oerlikon and NGK/NTK.

== Awards and honors ==
- 2024-2029: Max Planck Fellow
- 2024: Vice President of the International Society for Solid State Ionics (ISSI)
- 2024: Member of National Academy of Sciences Leopoldina
- 2024: American Ceramic Society's Richard M. Fulrath Award for excellence in research and development of ceramic sciences and materials
- 2021: Fellow of the Royal Chemical Society for outstanding achievements in chemical sciences (FRSC title)
- 2021: Samsung Recognition for Important Battery Advancements
- 2021: Nature Sustainability Expert Panel Leader for Batteries
- 2018: Merck Displaying Futures Award for energy implant device
- 2017: BASF and Volkswagen Science Award Electrochemistry for battery research
- 2018-2016: World Economic Forum council member on future of computing
- 2015: ERC Starting Grant
- 2015: World Economic Forum Top 40 international scientist under the age of 40
- 2014: Spark Award
- 2012: Swiss National Science Foundation SNSF Professorship Grant, Switzerland (2012)
- 2012: European Academy of Sciences Kepler Prize "Materials for Energy Technology"
- 2005: Young Scientist Award, International Solid State Ionics Society

== See also ==
- Lithionics
