= NOMFET =

Type of field-effect transistor

NOMFET is a nanoparticle organic memory field-effect transistor. The transistor is designed to mimic the feature of the human synapse known as plasticity, or the variation of the speed and strength of the signal going from neuron to neuron. The device uses gold nano-particles of about 5—20 nm set with pentacene to emulate the change in voltages and speed within the signal. This device uses charge trapping/detrapping in an array of gold nanoparticles (NPs) at the SiO_{2}/pentacene interface to design a SYNAPSTOR (synapse transistor) mimicking the dynamic plasticity of a biological synapse. This device (memristor-like) mimics short-term plasticity (STP) and temporal correlation plasticity (STDP, spike-timing dependent plasticity), two "functions" at the basis of learning processes. A compact model was developed, and these organic synapstors were used to demonstrate an associative memory, which can be trained to present a pavlovian response. A recent report showed that these organic synapse-transistors (synapstor) are working at 1 volt and with a plasticity typical response time in the range 100-200 ms. The device also works in contact with an electrolyte (EGOS : electrolyte gated organic synapstor) and can be interfaced with biologic neurons.

The recent creation of this novel transistor gives prospects to better recreation of certain types of human cognitive processes, such as recognition and image processing. When the NOMFET is used in a neuromorphic circuit it is able to replicate the functionality of plasticity that previously required groups of several transistors to emulate and thus continue to decrease the size of the processor that would be attempting to utilize the computational advantages of a pseudo-synaptic operation. (See Moore's Law)

== See also ==
- Artificial intelligence
- Organic field-effect transistor
