= Memtransistor =

Experimental multi-terminal electronic component

The memtransistor (a blend word from Memory Transfer Resistor) is an experimental multi-terminal passive electronic component that might be used in the construction of artificial neural networks. It is a combination of the memristor and transistor technology. This technology is different from the 1T-1R approach since the devices are merged into one single entity. Multiple memristors can be embedded with a single transistor, enabling it to more accurately model a neuron with its multiple synaptic connections. A neural network produced from these would provide hardware-based artificial intelligence with a good foundation.

== Applications ==
These types of devices would allow for a synapse model that could realise a learning rule, by which the synaptic efficacy is altered by voltages applied to the terminals of the device. An example of such a learning rule is spike-timing-dependent plasticity by which the weight of the synapse, in this case the conductivity, could be modulated based on the timing of pre and post synaptic spikes arriving at each terminal. The advantage of this approach over two terminal memristive devices is that read and write protocols have the possibility to occur simultaneously and distinctly.
