= David Luenberger =

American computer scientist (1937–2026)

David G. Luenberger
- Born: September 16, 1937; Los Angeles, California, U.S.
- Died: May 19, 2026 (aged 88); Stanford, California, U.S.
- Education: Stanford University
- Known for: Luenberger observer
- Awards: National Academy of Engineering 2008
- Scientific career
- Fields: Mathematics
- Workplaces: Stanford University
- Thesis: Determining the State of a Linear System with Observers of Low Dynamic Order
- Doctoral advisor: William Linvill
- Doctoral students: Darrell Duffie

David Gilbert Luenberger (September 16, 1937 – May 19, 2026) was an American mathematical scientist known for his research and his textbooks, which center on mathematical optimization. He was a professor in the department of Management Science and Engineering at Stanford University.

== Biography ==
Luenberger was one of the original founders of the Department of Engineering-Economic Systems in 1967. He served as chairman of the department for eleven years. He worked as a professor at the University for 50 years, retiring as of September 2013.

He has over 70 technical publications on systems and control, in optimization, in microeconomics, and in financial engineering. His Investment Science is widely prescribed and referenced by finance academics and practitioners.

He received his B.S. in Electrical Engineering from the California Institute of Technology in 1959, and he received his Ph.D. in Electrical Engineering from Stanford University in 1963. His PhD thesis was titled, "Determining the State of a Linear System with Observers of Low Dynamic Order". In his dissertation Luenberger introduced new methods for construction of state observers. The celebrated Luenberger observer is named after him.

Luenberger died on May 19, 2026, at the age of 88.

== Books ==
- ——— (2006). Information Science. Princeton University Press.
- ——— (1997). Investment Science. New York: Oxford University Press.
- ——— (1995). Microeconomic Theory. New York: McGraw-Hill.
- ———; Ye, Yinyu (2008). Linear and nonlinear programming. International Series in Operations Research & Management Science. Vol. 116 (Third ed.). New York: Springer. pp. xiv+546. ISBN 978-0-387-74502-2. MR 2423726.
- ——— (1979). Introduction to Dynamic Systems: Theory, Models and Applications. New York: John Wiley and Sons.
- ——— (1997) [1969]. Optimization by Vector Space Methods. New York: John Wiley and Sons. ISBN 0-471-18117-X.

== See also ==
- List of members of the National Academy of Engineering (Electronics)
