= William Linvill =

William K. Linvill
- Born: August 8, 1919; Kansas City, Missouri
- Died: August 17, 1980 (aged 61); Palo Alto, California
- Education: Massachusetts Institute of Technology
- Scientific career
- Fields: Electrical engineering
- Workplaces: Stanford University
- Doctoral advisor: Ernst Guillemin
- Doctoral students: David Luenberger; Bernard Widrow

William Kirby Linvill (August 8, 1919 – August 17, 1980) was an American electrical engineer. He served as a professor at Stanford University from 1960 to 1980. He was the founder of the Institute in Engineering-Economic Systems at Stanford, which later became the Department of Engineering-Economic Systems, with Linvill as the first chair.

His identical twin brother John was also a professor of electrical engineering at Stanford University.
