= Yinyu Ye =

American computer scientist

Yinyu Ye (Chinese: 叶荫宇; pinyin: Yè Yīnyǔ; born 1948) is a Chinese American theoretical computer scientist working on mathematical optimization. He is a specialist in interior point methods, especially in convex minimization and linear programming. He is a professor of Management Science and Engineering and Kwoh-Ting Li Chair Professor of Engineering at Stanford University. He also holds a courtesy appointment in the Department of Electrical Engineering. Ye also is a co-founder of minMax Optimization Inc.

== Education ==
Yinyu Ye was born in 1948 in Wuhan, Hubei, China. He attended Huazhong University of Science and Technology and graduated with a B.S. in Systems and Control in 1982. He received a Ph.D in Engineering Economic Systems from Stanford University in 1988, under the supervision of George B. Dantzig.

== Research publications ==
Ye wrote Interior-Point Algorithms: Theory and Analysis. He joined David Luenberger for the third edition of Luenberger's Linear and Nonlinear Programming.

In recent years, Ye has developed computational methods and theory using semidefinite programming for practical problems like the localization of network sensors. In computational economics, Ye has also established new complexity results for problems concerning the computation of an economic equilibrium.

== Awards ==
Ye was a 2009 co-recipient of the John von Neumann Theory Prize. He was elected to the 2006 class of Fellows of the Institute for Operations Research and the Management Sciences.

== Positions ==
Before joining Stanford University, Ye was a Henry B. Tippie Research Professor at the University of Iowa. Ye is a co-founder of minMax Optimization, a technology company based in Palo Alto and Shanghai focused on creating optimization tools for geospatial and financial problems.
