= Trancitor =

Transfer-capacitor

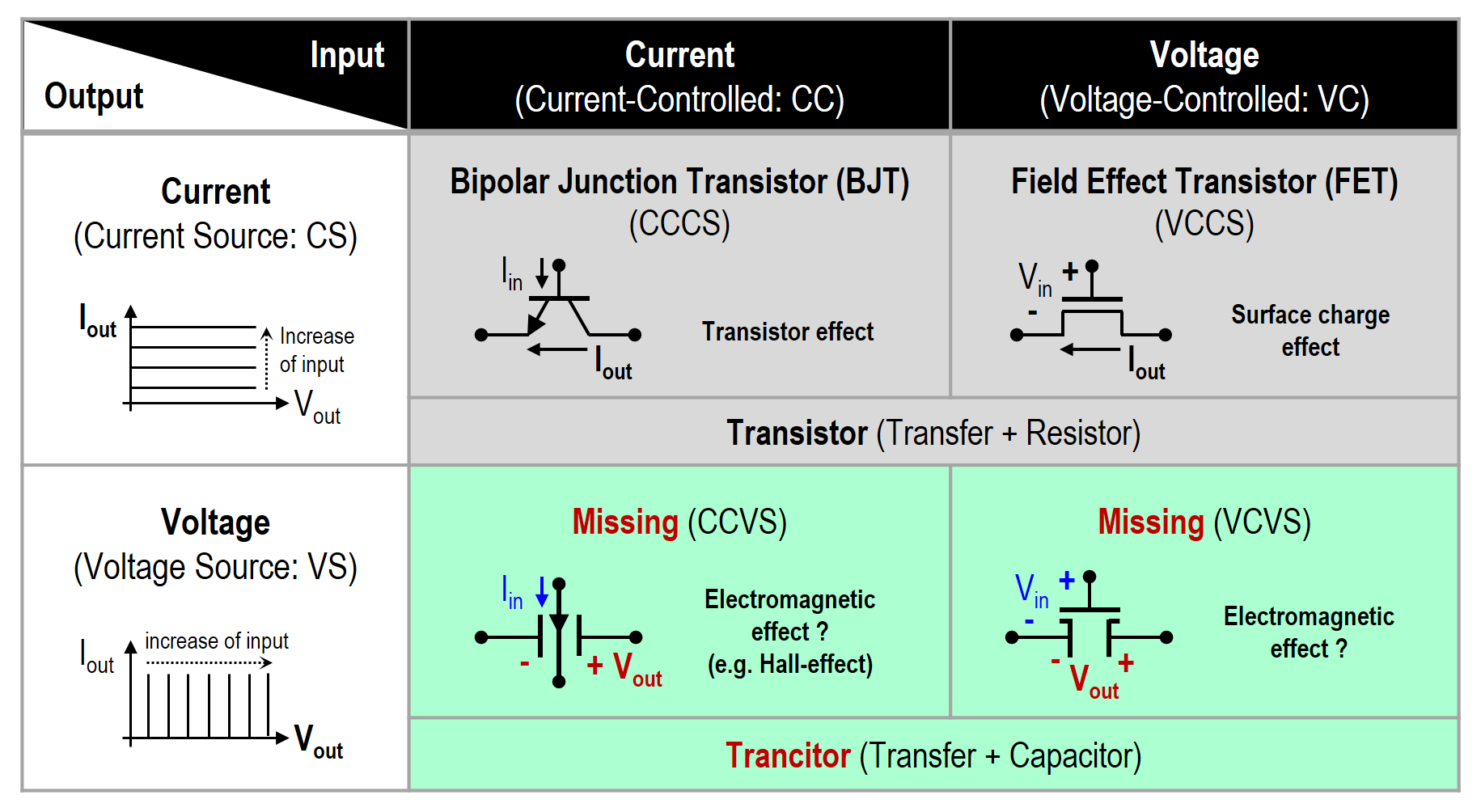
A theoretical list of elementary active devices deduced from 4 possible combinations of the current and voltage at the input and output, respectively.

The trancitor as the combined word of a "transfer-capacitor" is to be considered as another active-device category besides the transistor as a "transfer-resistor". As observed in the table shown, four kinds of active devices are theoretically deduced. Among them, trancitors are missing to be the third and fourth kinds, whereas transistors, such as bipolar junction transistor (BJT) and field-effect transistor (FET), were already invented as the first and second kinds, respectively. Unlike the transistor switching the current at its output (i.e., current source), the trancitor transfers its input to the voltage output (i.e., voltage source), so an inverse relationship with each other.

== History ==
The term, trancitor, and its concept were first conceived by Sungsik Lee, a professor at the Department of Electronics Engineering, Pusan National University, South Korea, through his article, entitled A Missing Active Device — Trancitor for a New Paradigm of Electronics, in arXiv uploaded on 30 April 2018, and published on 23 August 2018 in IEEE Access. And the supplementary video was also publicised. This story was first featured by the MIT Technology Review on 23 May 2018, entitled Another "Missing" Component could Revolutionize Electronics. Since then, it has been distributed and discussed by many other internet media and communities.

== See also ==
- Electrical element
- Memristor
