= Exclusion principle (philosophy) =

Philosophical principle relating to causality

The exclusion principle is a philosophical principle that states:

If an event e causes event e*, then there is no event e# such that e# is non-supervenient on e and e# causes e*.

== In physicalism ==
The exclusion principle is most commonly applied when one poses this scenario: One usually considers the desire to lift one's arm as a mental event, and the lifting of one's arm a physical event. According to the exclusion principle, there must be no event that does not supervene on e while causing e*. To show this better, substitute "the desire to lift one's arm" for "e", and "one to lift their arm" for "e*".

If the desire to lift one's arm causes one to lift their arm, then there is no event such that it is non-supervenient on the desire to lift one's arm and it causes one to lift their arm.

This is interpreted as meaning that mental events supervene upon the physical. However, some philosophers do not accept this principle, and accept epiphenomenalism, which states that mental events are caused by physical events, but physical events are not caused by mental events (called causal impotence). However, If e# does not cause e, then there is no way to verify that e* exists. Yet, this debate has not been settled in the philosophical community.
