= IPHT Jena =

German research facility

Coordinates: 50°54′33.52″N 11°34′02.11″E

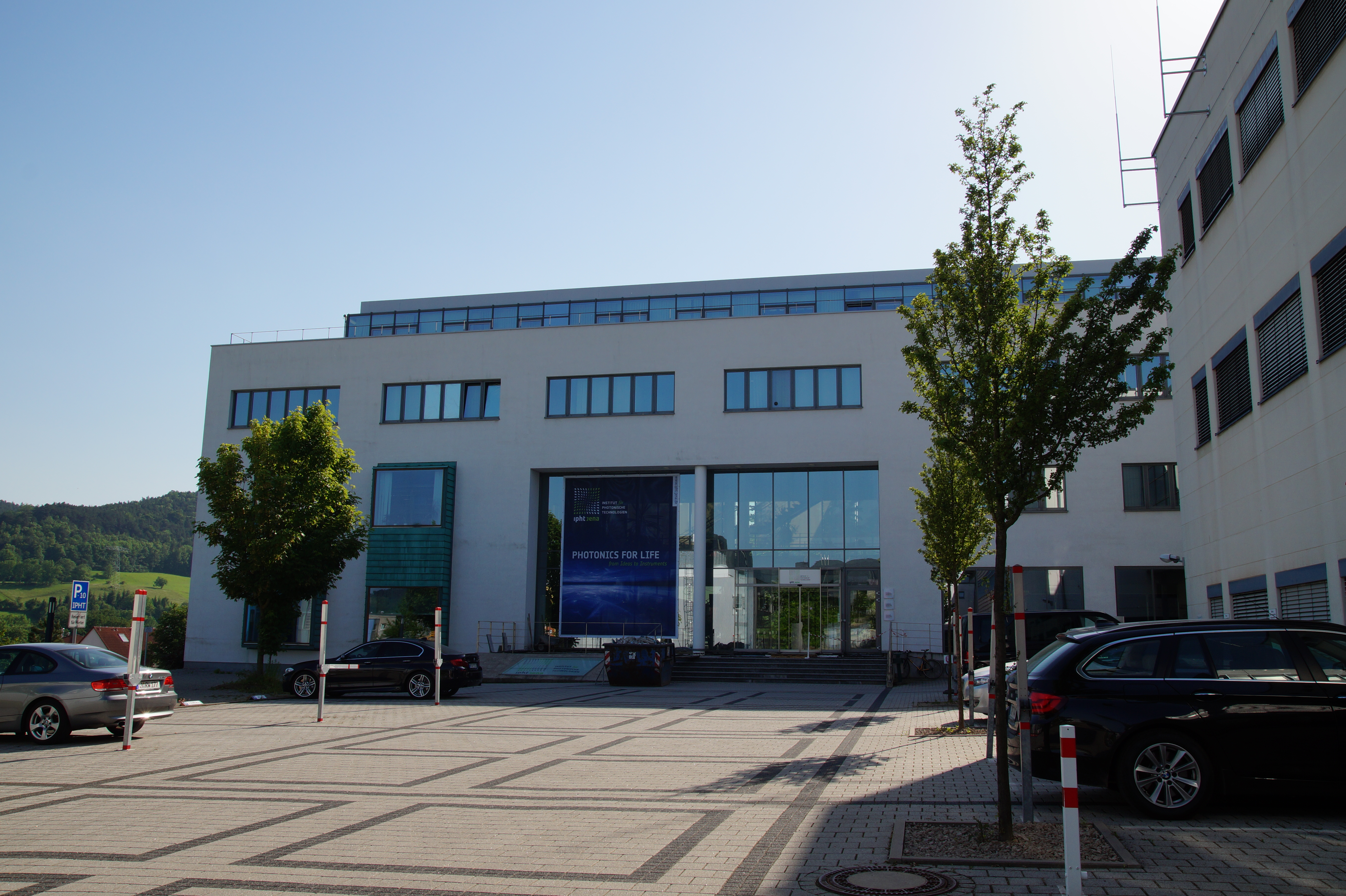
Institute of Photonic Technology

The Leibniz Institute of Photonic Technology (IPHT — German: Institut für Photonische Technologien) is a non-university research facility in Jena, Thuringia, Germany. Focused on applications for various physical systems, the Institute's mandate is to find solutions to challenges in high technology systems. IPHT carries out research in the following areas: magnetics, quantum electronics, optics, microsystems, biophotonics and laser technology. The Institute works with both universities and companies.

The IPHT coordinates several EU-Projects funded by the European Commission:

- Photonics4Life
- S-Pulse
- High-EF
- Rod-Sol
- Fiblys
