= Bernard Widrow =

American electrical engineer (1929–2025)

- Widrow demonstrating the "Knobby Adaline" device (1963)
- Born: December 24, 1929 (age 96); Norwich, Connecticut, United States
- Died: September 30, 2025 (aged 95)
- Education: Massachusetts Institute of Technology
- Scientific career
- Fields: Electrical engineering
- Workplaces: Stanford University
- Doctoral advisor: William Linvill
- Doctoral students: Parham Aarabi; Marcian Hoff; Richard Mattson; Alvy Ray Smith

Bernard Widrow (December 24, 1929 – September 30, 2025) was an American professor of electrical engineering at Stanford University known for his work on artificial neural networks. He co-invented the Widrow–Hoff least mean squares filter (LMS) adaptive algorithm with his doctoral student Ted Hoff. The LMS algorithm led to the ADALINE and MADALINE artificial neural networks, and to the backpropagation technique. He made fundamental contributions to the development of digital signal processing in the fields of geophysics, adaptive antennas, and adaptive filtering.

Widrow was the namesake of "Uncle Bernie's Rule": the training sample size should be ten times the number of weights in a network.

== Biography ==
This section is based on.

=== Early life and education ===
Widrow was born in Norwich, Connecticut. While young, he was interested in electronics. During WWII, he found an entry on "Radios" in the World Book Encyclopedia, and built a one-tube radio.

He entered MIT in 1947, studied electrical engineering and electronics, and graduated in 1951. After that, he got a research assistantship in the MIT Digital Computer Laboratory, in the magnetic core memory group. The DCL was a division of the Servomechanisms Laboratory, which was building the Whirlwind I computer. The experience of building magnetic core memory shaped his understanding of computers into a "memory's eye view", that is, he "look for the memory and see what you have to connect around it".

For his masters thesis (1953, advised by William Linvill), he worked on raising the signal-to-noise ratio of the sensing signal of magnetic core memory. Back then, the hysteresis loops for magnetic core memory was not square enough, making sensing signal noisy.

For his PhD (1956, advised by William Linvill), he worked on the statistical theory of quantization noise, inspired by work by William Linvill and David Middleton.

During PhD, he learned the Wiener filter from Lee Yuk-wing. To design a Wiener filter, one must know the statistics of the noiseless signal that one wants to recover. However, if the statistics of the noiseless signal is unknown, this cannot be designed. Widrow thus designed an adaptive filter that uses gradient descent to minimize the mean square error. He also attended the Dartmouth workshop in 1956 and was inspired to work on artificial intelligence

=== Work on AI ===
In 1959, he got his first graduate student, Ted Hoff. They improved the previous adaptive filter so that it made a gradient descent for each datapoint, resulting in the delta rule and the ADALINE. To avoid having to hand-tune the weights in ADALINE, they invented the memistor, with conductance (ADALINE weights) being the thickness of the copper on the graphite.

During a meeting with Frank Rosenblatt, Widrow argued that the S-units in the perceptron machine should not be connected randomly to the A-units. Instead, the S-units should be removed, so that the photocell inputs would be directly inputted into the A-units. Rosenblatt objected that "the human retina is built that way".

Despite many attempts, they never succeeded in developing a training algorithm for a multilayered neural network. The furthest they got was with Madaline Rule I (1962), which had two weight layers. The first was trainable, but the second was fixed. Widrow stated their problem would have been solved by the backpropagation algorithm. "This was long before Paul Werbos. Backprop to me is almost miraculous."

=== Adaptive filtering ===
Unable to train multilayered neural networks, Widrow turned to adaptive filtering and adaptive signal processing, using techniques based on the LMS filter for applications such as adaptive antenna, adaptive noise canceling, and applications to medicine.

At a 1985 conference in Snowbird, Utah, he noticed that neural network research was returning, and he also learned of the backpropagation algorithm. After that, he returned to neural network research.

== Publications ==
- 1965 "A critical comparison of two kinds of adaptive classification networks", K. Steinbuch and B. Widrow, IEEE Transactions on Electronic Computers, pp. 737–740.
- 1985 B. Widrow and S. D. Stearns. Adaptive Signal Processing. New Jersey: Prentice-Hall, Inc., 1985.
- 1994 B. Widrow and E. Walach. Adaptive Inverse Control. New Jersey: Prentice-Hall, Inc., 1994.
- 2008 B. Widrow and I. Kollar. Quantization Noise: Roundoff Error in Digital Computation, Signal Processing, Control, and Communications. Cambridge University Press, 2008.
- 2023 B. Widrow. Cybernetics 2.0. Cham: Springer Nature Switzerland

== Honors ==
- Elected Fellow IEEE, 1976
- Elected Fellow AAAS, 1980
- IEEE Centennial Medal, 1984
- IEEE Alexander Graham Bell Medal, 1986
- IEEE Neural Networks Pioneer Medal, 1991
- Inducted into the National Academy of Engineering, 1995
- IEEE Signal Processing Society Award, 1999
- IEEE Millennium Medal, 2000
- Benjamin Franklin Medal, 2001
- International Neural Network Society (INNIS) Board member 2004

He was one of the Board of Governors of the International Neural Network Society (INNIS) in 2003.

Awards
Preceded by Charles K. Kao	IEEE Alexander Graham Bell Medal; 1986	Succeeded by Joel S. Engel, Richard H. Frenkiel and William C. Jakes, Jr.
