= Shana Mabari =

American contemporary artist

Shana Mabari (born April 4, 1969) is an American contemporary artist who lives and works in Los Angeles. Central to her artistic practice is a focus on the intersection of art, science, and technology as articulated in her sculptures, installations, and immersive environments. Working in industrially fabricated acrylic, steel, and reflective materials, Mabari engages with color, light, reflection, geometric form, and scale in a manner that connects to the Light and Space art movement that originated in Southern California in the 1960s. Artist residencies with NASA in 2018 and the international nonprofit organization Sea Shepherd Global in 2020 further expanded Mabari's practice.

For her sculpture and installations, Mabari designs on computer and builds scale models. From 2013 to 2023, she collaborated with Jack Brogan, the renowned Southern California–based fabricator who produced works by Light and Space artists such as Peter Alexander, Larry Bell, and Robert Irwin.

== Background ==
Mabari was born in Los Angeles to an American mother and an Israeli father. She grew up in the Fairfax District.

From 1989 to 1991, Mabari studied fine art at the École Nationale Supérieure des Beaux-Arts de Paris, École Parsons à Paris, and the American University of Paris. In 1998, she graduated with a B.F.A. from Otis College of Art and Design in Los Angeles. She has also lived and worked in Northern India, Southeast Asia, Tel Aviv, and Ibiza, Spain.

== Art and science collaborations ==
=== Neuromorphic Engineering Workshop ===
In 2003, Mabari collaborated with neuromorphic engineer Tobias Delbruck and robotics physicist Mark Tilden on the Biomorphic Pendulum, a prototype for a larger immersive experience at the Neuromorphic Engineering Workshop in Telluride, Colorado.

=== California Institute of Technology ===
In 2004, Mabari and Caltech professor of experimental psychology Dr. Shinsuke Shimojo were awarded a patent for the design of Dynamic Spatial Illusions, a portable version of a visual-and-sensory experimental environment.

== Major projects ==
=== ILLUMETRIC triptych ===
In 2014, Mabari was awarded an Artists' Resource for Completion (ARC) grant by the Center for Cultural Innovation to fund ILLUMETRIC, a trio of monumental cast-acrylic sculptures on steel bases. The work was installed along the landscaped median of Santa Monica Blvd. as part of the Art on the Outside public art program sponsored by the City of West Hollywood's Arts and Cultural Affairs Commission and was on display from June 2014 through July 2016. Each of three pieces measures more than ten feet tall and is cast in acrylic in highly saturated primary colors as a geometric form–a diamond, a cube, and a rectangle. LED lights powered by photovoltaic cells illuminated the sculptures from within so that each piece reached a glowing luminescence upon sunset.

=== Astral Challenger ===
In 2016, Mabari's site-specific sculpture Astral Challenger was put on permanent display by the City of Lancaster, California, on the roundabout at the intersection of Challenger Way and Avenue L. The 20-foot-tall stainless-steel-and-acrylic structure was the first piece to be commissioned by the city's Arts and Public Places program, with 75% of the funding provided through a California Department of Transportation (Caltrans) grant. Conceived as both a tribute to the city's achievements in the aerospace industry and to honor the astronauts lost in the 1986 space shuttle Challenger disaster, its minimalist form evokes the silhouette of a rocket while maintaining an illusion of near weightlessness. At night, the sculpture is illuminated by LED lights encased within the 19-foot diameter concrete pad upon which it sits.

== Artist residencies ==
=== NASA ===
In 2018, Mabari was selected to be the first artist to fly aboard a mission of NASA's Stratospheric Observatory for Infrared Astronomy (SOFIA), which uses a 2.7-meter telescope mounted in a customized 747 flying to a maximum altitude of 45,000 feet to study such astronomical phenomena as black holes and star formation. The residency inspired a diverse body of work that includes the Meteor series of lustrous gemlike acrylic sculptures, each approximately 5 inches in dimension, and three series of prints on metallic paper, Planeta, Constellatio, and Stella.

=== Sea Shepherd Global ===
Mabari was the first artist-in-residence aboard a mission of Sea Shepard Global, the non-profit, direct-action ocean conservation organization. The five-day seaborn residency in 2020 involved a clandestine effort to combat illegal, unreported, and unregulated fishing in the Gulf of Guinea off the coast of Benin in West Africa and resulted in the arrest of a trawler for violating protected waters near an ecological reserve. The residency inspired two separate series in Mabari's Oceans body of work. The first, Korāl, includes 60 freestanding acrylic cylinder sculptures ranging in height from 7 to 14 inches each that together evoke the beauty and ephemerality of coral reefs. The second, Horizōns, consists of eight wall-mounted 15-inch disks in clear acrylic bisected by a luminous blue line suggesting the meeting of sea and sky.
