= Massimiliano Versace =

Italian artificial intelligence scholar

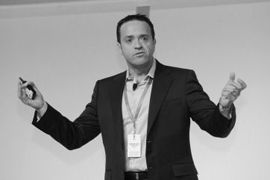
- Versace in 2011
- Born: 21 December 1972 (age 53); Italy
- Education: University of Trieste; Boston University
- Known for: Deep Learning Neural networks NASA SyNAPSE
- Awards: Fulbright Scholar
- Scientific career
- Fields: Artificial Intelligence Deep Learning
- Workplaces: Boston University Neurala
- Thesis: Spikes, synchrony, and attentive learning by laminar thalamocortical circuits (2007)
- Doctoral advisor: Stephen Grossberg
- Website: maxversace.com

Massimiliano Versace (born 21 December 1972) is an Italian-American artificial intelligence researcher and entrepreneur. He co-founded Neurala, a Boston-based artificial intelligence software company, and later became Global Head of Emergent AI at Analog Devices. He previously directed Boston University's Neuromorphics Laboratory.

== Early life and education ==
Versace grew up in Monfalcone, Italy and moved to the United States in 2001 as a Fulbright scholar. He holds a masters in psychology from the University of Trieste and two PhDs (Experimental Psychology, University of Trieste, Italy—Cognitive and Neural Systems, Boston University, USA).

== Career ==
Versace co-founded edge machine learning company Neurala in 2006, with three colleagues from Boston University. The company's visual-inspection software evolved from earlier NASA-funded rover work.

From 2011 to 2016, Versace and his team at Neurala worked with NASA and built deep learning models able to learn power navigation and perception for exploring novel environments in real-time.

As Artificial Intelligence Professor at Boston University, Versace founded the Neuromorphics Lab, and in 2009-2011 the lab led a main research thrust in the DARPA SyNAPSE in collaboration with Hewlett-Packard designing artificial nervous systems, based on deep learning, implemented on novel memristor-based devices. In December 2010, Versace published a cover-featured articled on the IEEE Spectrum describing the roadmap to develop a large scale brain model making use of memristor based technologies.

The model designed by Versace and his colleagues, termed Modular Neural Exploring Traveling Agent (MoNETA) was the first large-scale neural network model to implement whole-brain circuits to power a virtual and robotic agent compatibly with memristor-based hardware computations. A cover page article in IEEE Computer features the software platform and modeling implemented by the joint HP and Boston University teams, and the March 2012 edition of IEEE Pulse features his lab work on brain modeling.

Versace's work has been featured in TIME Magazine, New York Times, Nasdaq, The Boston Globe, Xconomy, IEEE Spectrum, Fortune, CNBC, The Chicago Tribune, TechCrunch, VentureBeat, Associated Press, and Geek Magazine.

As of December 2025, Versace was Vice President of Emergent AI at Analog Devices.

== Awards ==
Versace is a recipient of the Fulbright Fellowship in 2001. Versace is also recipient of the CELEST Award for Computational Modeling of Brain and Behavior in 2009, and was awarded top cited article 2008–2010 in Brain Research.

== Research ==
Versace has pioneered research in continual learning neural networks, in particular applied to cortical models of learning and memory, and how to build intelligent machines equipped with low-power, high density neural chips that implement large-scale brain circuits of increasing complexity. His Synchronous Matching Adaptive Resonance Theory (SMART) model shows spiking laminar cortical circuits self-organize and stably learn relevant information, and how these circuits be embedded in low-power, memristor-based hybrid CMOS chip and used to solve challenging pattern recognition problems. His work has been featured on Fortune, Inc, Tech Crunch, IEEE Spectrum, Venture Beat, among others.

== See also ==
- Physical neural network
- Neuromorphic
- machine learning
