= Vision sensor =

Vision sensor may refer to:

- A camera with an imager chip
- Smart or intelligent vision sensor, a combination of digital camera with a processing unit
- Dynamic vision sensor, a neuromorphic digital camera, which responds to local changes in brightness
