= Dharmendra Modha =

American computer scientist

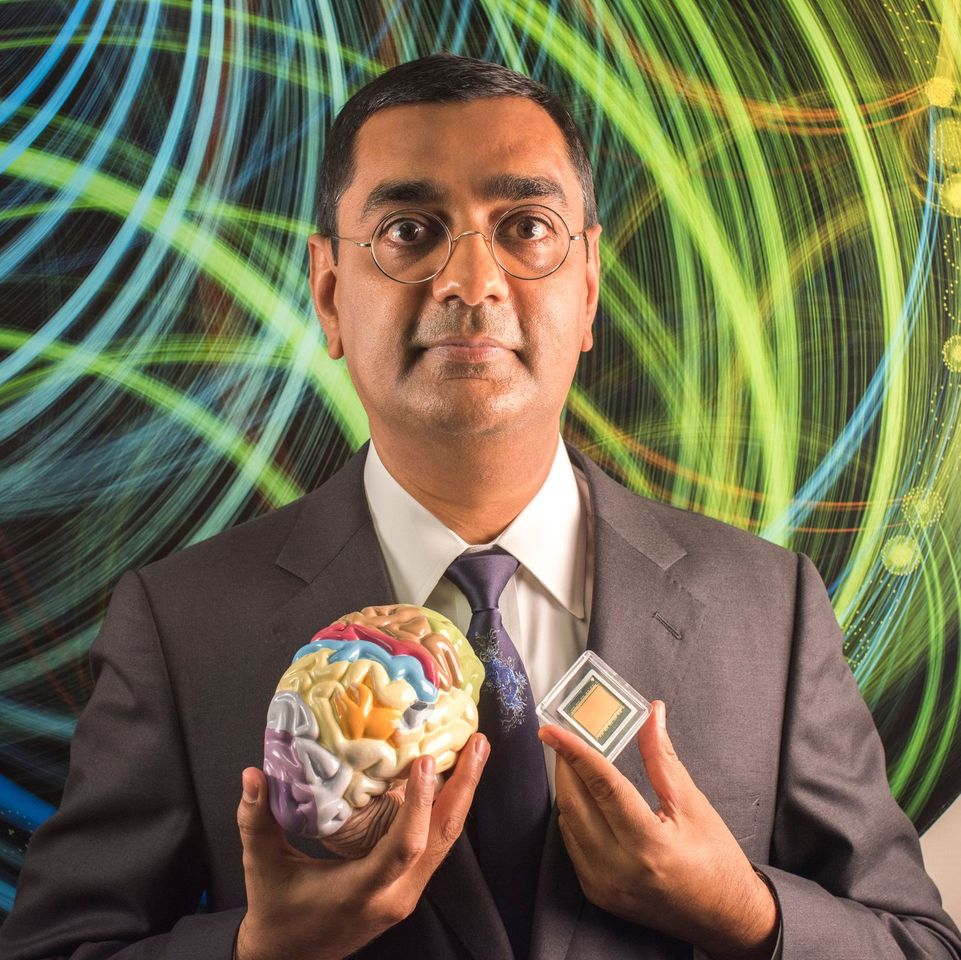
- Born: Dharmendra Modha
- Employer: IBM
- Website: modha.org

Dharmendra S. Modha is an Indian American manager and lead researcher of the Cognitive Computing group at IBM Almaden Research Center. He is known for his pioneering works in Artificial Intelligence and Mind Simulation. In November 2009, Modha announced at a supercomputing conference that his team had written a program that simulated a cat brain. He is the recipient of multiple honors, including the Gordon Bell Prize, given each year to recognize outstanding achievement in high-performance computing applications. In November 2012, Modha announced on his blog that using 96 Blue Gene/Q racks of the Lawrence Livermore National Laboratory Sequoia supercomputer (1,572,864 processor cores, 1.5 PB memory, 98,304 MPI processes, and 6,291,456 threads), a combined IBM and LBNL team achieved an unprecedented scale of 2.084 billion neurosynaptic cores containing 530 billion neurons and 137 trillion synapses running only 1542× slower than real time. In August 2014 a paper describing the TrueNorth Architecture, "the first-ever production-scale 'neuromorphic' computer chip designed to work more like a mammalian brain than" a processor was published in the journal Science. TrueNorth project culminated in a 64 million neuron system for running deep neural network applications.

== Personal life ==
Modha holds a BTech in Computer Science and Engineering from IIT Bombay (1990), India and a PhD in Electrical and Computer Engineering from UCSD. He received his PhD at the Jacobs School of Engineering in 1995 and is now manager of Cognitive Computing at IBM's Almaden Research Center and a Master Inventor. He is a Senior Member of IEEE and a member of AAAS, ACM, and SfN.

== Achievements ==
Modha is manager of the Cognitive Computing group at IBM's Almaden Research Center. He chaired IBM's 2006 Almaden Institute on Cognitive Computing, co-chaired Cognitive Computing 2007 at Berkeley, CA, and was a speaker at the Decade of the Mind Symposium in May 2007. He is the Principal Investigator for DARPA SyNAPSE proposal that brought together IBM (Almaden, Watson, Zurich, India), Stanford University, University of Wisconsin-Madison, Cornell University, Columbia University, and University of California, Merced to embark upon the ambitious quest of cognitive computing to engineer intelligent business machines by reverse-engineering the computational function of the brain and delivering it in a small, energy efficient chip. Over the last two decades, he has founded two start-up companies, been issued 26 U.S. patents and has authored over 40 publications in international journals and conferences.

== Recognition ==
- He performed cortical simulations at scale of cat cerebral cortex (1 billion neurons, 10 trillion synapses) only 100x slower than real-time on a 147,456 processor BlueGene/P supercomputer. This work received ACM's Gordon Bell Prize.
- At IBM, he has won the Pat Goldberg Memorial Best Paper award, an Outstanding Innovation Award, an Outstanding Technical Achievement Award, and Communication Systems Best Paper Award.
- He is currently an IBM Fellow.
- He is currently an IBM Master Inventor.

== Criticism ==
- The validity of the cat brain simulation project has been called into question by competing neuroscience researchers.
