= Optical chip =

Optical chip may refer to:

- An integrated circuit that acts as the electrical-optical interface for fiber-optic communication
- A vision chip which combines optical sensors and computation
- A chip used in optical computing
  - A photonic integrated circuit
  - A chip that uses an optical interconnect
