= Hardware for artificial intelligence =

Hardware specially designed and optimized for artificial intelligence

Specialized computer hardware is often used to execute artificial intelligence (AI) programs faster, and with less energy, such as Lisp machines, neuromorphic engineering, event cameras, and physical neural networks. Since 2017, several consumer grade central processing units (CPUs) and systems on a chip (SoCs) have on-die neural processing units (NPUs). As of 2023, the market for AI hardware is dominated by graphics processing units (GPUs), such as those by Nvidia and AMD, newer domain-specific accelerators such as Google's Tensor Processing Units (TPUs), and various NPUs found in consumer hardware.

== Scope ==
For the purposes of this article, AI hardware refers to computing components and systems specifically designed or optimized to accelerate artificial-intelligence workloads such as machine-learning training or inference. This includes general-purpose accelerators used for AI (for example, GPUs) and domain-specific accelerators (for example, TPUs, NPUs, and other AI application-specific integrated circuits (ASICs)).

Event-based cameras are sometimes discussed in the context of neuromorphic computing, but they are input sensors rather than AI compute devices. Conversely, components such as memristors are basic circuit elements rather than specialized AI hardware when considered alone.

== Lisp machines ==
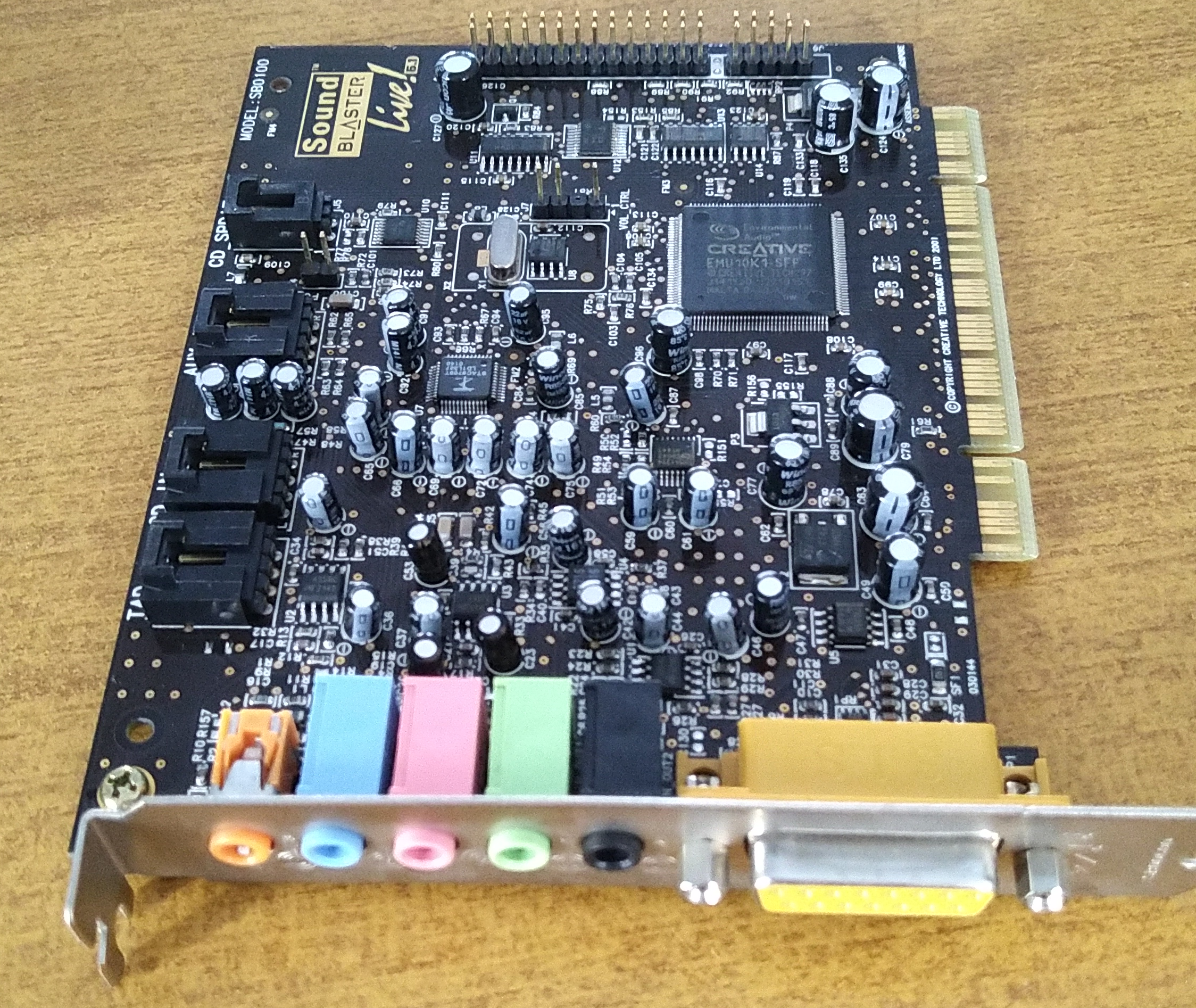
Computer hardware

Lisp machines were developed in the late 1970s and early 1980s to make artificial intelligence programs written in the programming language Lisp run faster.

== Dataflow architecture ==
Dataflow architecture processors used for AI serve various purposes with varied implementations like the polymorphic dataflow Convolution Engine by Kinara (formerly Deep Vision), structure-driven dataflow by Hailo, and dataflow scheduling by Cerebras.

== Component hardware ==
=== AI accelerators ===
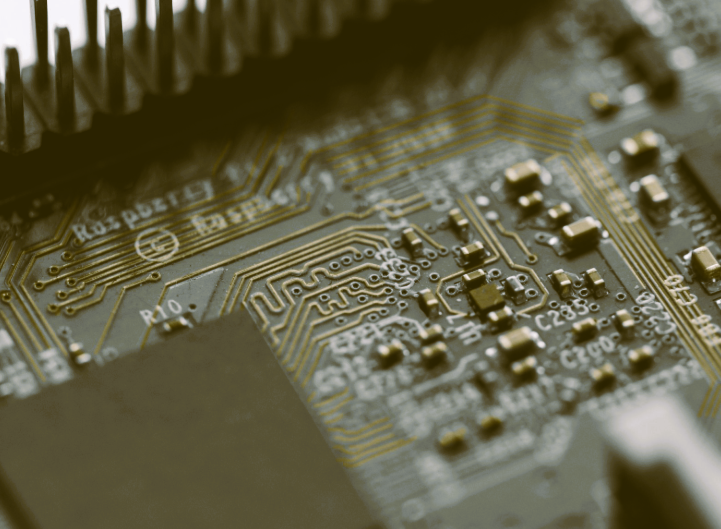
AI Accelerators Component hardware

Since the 2010s, advances in computer hardware have led to more efficient methods for training deep neural networks that contain many layers of non-linear hidden units and a very large output layer. By 2019, graphics processing units (GPUs), often with AI-specific enhancements, had displaced central processing units (CPUs) as the dominant means to train large-scale commercial cloud AI. OpenAI estimated the hardware compute used in the largest deep learning projects from Alex Net (2012) to Alpha Zero (2017), and found a 300,000-fold increase in the amount of compute needed, with a doubling-time trend of 3.4 months.

=== General-purpose GPUs for AI ===
Since the 2010s, graphics processing units (GPUs) have been widely used to train and deploy deep learning models because of their highly parallel architecture and high memory bandwidth. Modern data-center GPUs include dedicated tensor or matrix-math units that accelerate neural-network operations.

In 2022, NVIDIA introduced the Hopper-generation H100 GPU, adding FP8 precision support and faster interconnects for large-scale model training. AMD and other vendors have also developed GPUs and accelerators aimed at AI and high-performance computing workloads. Processing in memory devices can be used in place of industry standard high bandwidth memory (HBM) stacks to speed up computation and increase efficiency by placing some processing functions very close to the memory cells within the devices, at the cost of lower memory capacity per device due to the footprint required by the added processors within the device.

=== Domain-specific accelerators (ASICs / NPUs) ===
Beyond general-purpose GPUs, several companies have developed application-specific integrated circuits (ASICs) and neural processing units (NPUs) tailored for AI workloads. Google introduced the Tensor Processing Unit (TPU) in 2016 for deep-learning inference, with later generations supporting large-scale training through dense systolic array designs and optical interconnects. Other vendors have released similar devices—such as Apple's Neural Engine and various on-device NPUs—that emphasize energy-efficient inference in mobile or edge computing environments. FPGAs are similar to ASICs in that they operate on a design that is not general purpose, however it is user defined and more suitable for low scale production which is the opposite of ASICs. Neuromorphic and Analog AI accelerators promise to reduce the amount of power consumed by AI by either replacing digital computation with analog computation, or replicating neural networks directly in hardware. Photonic processors have been explored. Cerebras has launched a wafer scale processor to place large amounts of SRAM on a single processor and speed up memory bandwidth for AI, and Groq has designed an LPU with large amounts of SRAM for low time to first token unlike traditional NPUs, which focus on compute throughput. Taalas has developed ASICs that implement as hardware logic gates a specific AI model and are thus only capable of running that model, similarly to mask ROMs. The model is 'etched' as a circuit design onto the silicon via semiconductor device manufacturing and thus cannot be changed. However it has demonstrated speeds of up to 17,000 tokens per second.

=== Memory and interconnects ===
AI accelerators rely on fast memory and inter-chip links to manage the large data volumes of training and inference. High-bandwidth memory (HBM) stacks, standardized as HBM3 in 2022, provide terabytes-per-second throughput on modern GPUs and ASICs. These accelerators are often connected through dedicated fabrics such as NVIDIA's NVLink and NVSwitch or optical interconnects used in TPU systems to scale performance across thousands of chips.
