= Vision chip =

A vision chip is an integrated circuit having both image sensing circuitry and image processing circuitry on the same die. The image sensing circuitry may be implemented using charge-coupled devices, active pixel sensor circuits, or any other light sensing mechanism. The image processing circuitry may be implemented using analog, digital, or mixed signal (analog and digital) circuitry. One area of research is the use of neuromorphic engineering techniques to implement processing circuits inspired by biological neural systems. The output of a vision chip is generally a partially processed image or a high-level information signal revealing something about the observed scene. Although there is no standard definition of a vision chip, the processing performed may comprise anything from processing individual pixel values to performing complex image processing functions and outputting a single value or yes/no signal based on the scene.

== Types of processing performed in a vision chip ==
There is no standard definition of what constitutes a vision chip and thus the type of circuitry that may be performed. Below is a sample list of processing steps reported in vision chip designs, as reported in several books.:

=== Light sensing techniques ===
- Active pixel sensors (APS)
- Charge-coupled devices
- Logarithmic compression pixels
- Microbolometers for thermal imaging

=== Spatial processing techniques ===
- Lateral inhibition
- Artificial silicon retina circuits
- Contrast enhancement
- Edge or other static feature detection

=== Temporal processing techniques ===
- Intensity change detection
- Detection of visual motion / optical flow

=== Other techniques ===
- Cellular nonlinear networks

== Commercially available vision chips ==
The overwhelming majority of vision chip designs were executed largely by academic institutions as part of research projects. However several designs have, at one point or another, been commercialized as a product.

- Optical mouse sensor: The sensor chip used in an optical mouse is a vision chip.
- Mitsubishi silicon retina chip

== See also ==
- Optical flow sensor
- Active pixel sensor
- Charge-coupled device
- Neuromorphic engineering
- Vision processing unit, a class of processor for accelerating machine vision, possibly including camera interfaces, but not directly including photosensitive elements
