= Jack Brogan =

American art fabricator (1930–2022)

Jack Brogan (May 12, 1930 – September 14, 2022) was an American art fabricator. He helped produce works by numerous artists including Peter Alexander, Larry Bell, Robert Irwin, Helen Pashgian and Shana Mabari.
