= Tobias Delbruck =

American neuromorphic engineer at the University of Zurich and ETH Zurich, Switzerland

Tobias "Tobi" Delbrück (often written Delbruck) (born 1960, Pasadena, California) is an American neuromorphic engineer at the University of Zurich and ETH Zurich, Switzerland. He was named Fellow of the Institute of Electrical and Electronics Engineers (IEEE) in 2014 "for contributions to neuromorphic visual sensors and processing".

== Family and education ==
Tobi is the son of Mary Adeline Bruce and Max Delbrück, the 1969 Nobel laureate in Physiology or Medicine. Delbrück has a Bachelor's degree in physics and applied mathematics from the University of California, San Diego and obtained a PhD in computation and neural systems at Caltech in 1993 under the guidance of Carver Mead.
