= Cognitive computer =

Machine designed to mimic the human brain

A cognitive computer is a computer that hardwires artificial intelligence and machine learning algorithms into an integrated circuit that closely reproduces the behavior of the human brain. It generally adopts a neuromorphic engineering approach. Synonyms include neuromorphic chip and cognitive chip.

In 2023, IBM's proof-of-concept NorthPole chip (optimized for 2-, 4- and 8-bit precision) achieved remarkable performance in image recognition.

In 2013, IBM developed Watson, a cognitive computer that uses neural networks and deep learning techniques. The following year, it developed the 2014 TrueNorth microchip architecture which is designed to be closer in structure to the human brain than the von Neumann architecture used in conventional computers. In 2017, Intel also announced its version of a cognitive chip in "Loihi, which it intended to be available to university and research labs in 2018. Intel (most notably with its Pohoiki Beach and Springs systems), Qualcomm, and others are improving neuromorphic processors steadily.

== IBM TrueNorth chip ==
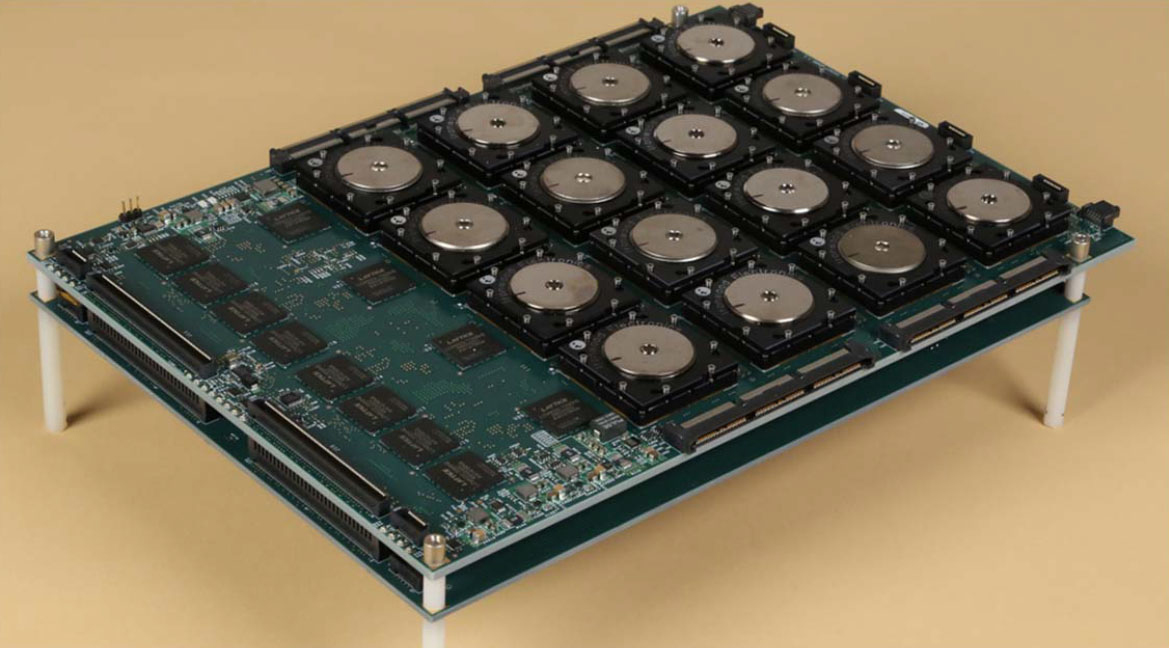
DARPA SyNAPSE board with 16 TrueNorth chips

TrueNorth was a neuromorphic CMOS integrated circuit produced by IBM in 2014. It is a manycore processor network on a chip design, with 4096 cores, each one having 256 programmable simulated neurons for a total of just over a million neurons. In turn, each neuron has 256 programmable "synapses" that convey the signals between them. Hence, the total number of programmable synapses is just over 268 million (2^{28}). Its basic transistor count is 5.4 billion.

In 2023 Zhejiang University and Alibaba developed a neuromorphic chip called Darwin3.

=== Details ===
Memory, computation, and communication are handled in each of the 4096 neurosynaptic cores, TrueNorth circumvents the von Neumann-architecture bottleneck and is very energy-efficient, with IBM claiming a power consumption of 70 milliwatts and a power density that is 1/10,000th of conventional microprocessors. The SyNAPSE chip operates at lower temperatures and power because it only draws power necessary for computation. Skyrmions have been proposed as models of the synapse on a chip.

The neurons are emulated using a Linear-Leak Integrate-and-Fire (LLIF) model, a simplification of the leaky integrate-and-fire model.

According to IBM, it does not have a clock, operates on unary numbers, and computes by counting to a maximum of 19 bits. The cores are event-driven by using both synchronous and asynchronous logic, and are interconnected through an asynchronous packet-switched mesh network on chip (NOC).

IBM developed a new network to program and use TrueNorth. It included a simulator, a new programming language, an integrated programming environment, and libraries. This lack of backward compatibility with any previous technology (e.g., C++ compilers) poses serious vendor lock-in risks and other adverse consequences that may prevent it from commercialization in the future.

=== Research ===
In 2018, a cluster of TrueNorth network-linked to a master computer was used in stereo vision research that attempted to extract the depth of rapidly moving objects in a scene.

== IBM NorthPole chip ==
In 2023, IBM released its NorthPole chip, which is a proof-of-concept for dramatically improving performance by intertwining compute with memory on-chip, thus eliminating the Von Neumann bottleneck. It blends approaches from IBM's 2014 TrueNorth system with modern hardware designs to achieve speeds about 4,000 times faster than TrueNorth. It can run ResNet-50 or Yolo-v4 image recognition tasks about 22 times faster, with 25 times less energy and 5 times less space, when compared to GPUs which use the same 12-nm node process that it was fabricated with. It includes 224 MB of RAM and 256 processor cores and can perform 2,048 operations per core per cycle at 8-bit precision, and 8,192 operations at 2-bit precision. It runs at between 25 and 425 MHz. This is an inferencing chip, but it cannot yet handle GPT-4 because of memory and accuracy limitations

== Intel Loihi chip ==
=== Pohoiki Springs ===
Pohoiki Springs is a system that incorporates Intel's self-learning neuromorphic chip, named Loihi, introduced in 2017, perhaps named after the Hawaiian seamount Lōʻihi. Intel claims Loihi is about 1000 times more energy efficient than general-purpose computing systems used to train neural networks. In theory, Loihi supports both machine learning training and inference on the same silicon independently of a cloud connection, and more efficiently than convolutional neural networks or deep learning neural networks. Intel points to a system for monitoring a person's heartbeat, taking readings after events such as exercise or eating, and using the chip to normalize the data and work out the ‘normal’ heartbeat. It can then spot abnormalities and deal with new events or conditions.

The first iteration of the chip was made using Intel's 14 nm fabrication process and houses 128 clusters of 1,024 artificial neurons each for a total of 131,072 simulated neurons. This offers around 130 million synapses, far less than the human brain's 800 trillion synapses, and behind IBM's TrueNorth. Loihi is available for research purposes among more than 40 academic research groups as a USB form factor.

In October 2019, researchers from Rutgers University published a research paper to demonstrate the energy efficiency of Intel's Loihi in solving simultaneous localization and mapping.

In March 2020, Intel and Cornell University published a research paper to demonstrate the ability of Intel's Loihi to recognize different hazardous materials, which could eventually aid to "diagnose diseases, detect weapons and explosives, find narcotics, and spot signs of smoke and carbon monoxide".

=== Pohoiki Beach ===
Intel's Loihi 2, named Pohoiki Beach, was released in September 2021 with 64 cores. It boasts faster speeds, higher-bandwidth inter-chip communications for enhanced scalability, increased capacity per chip, a more compact size due to process scaling, and improved programmability.

=== Hala Point ===
Hala Point packages 1,152 Loihi 2 processors produced on Intel 3 process node in a six-rack-unit chassis. The system supports up to 1.15 billion neurons and 128 billion synapses distributed over 140,544 neuromorphic processing cores, consuming 2,600 watts of power. It includes over 2,300 embedded x86 processors for ancillary computations.

Intel claimed in 2024 that Hala Point was the world’s largest neuromorphic system. It uses Loihi 2 chips. It is claimed to offer 10x more neuron capacity and up to 12x higher performance. The Darwin3 chip exceeds these specs.

Hala Point provides up to 20 quadrillion operations per second, (20 petaops), with efficiency exceeding 15 trillion (8-bit) operations s^{−1} W^{−1} on conventional deep neural networks.

Hala Point integrates processing, memory and communication channels in a massively parallelized fabric, providing 16 PB s^{−1} of memory bandwidth, 3.5 PB s^{−1} of inter-core communication bandwidth, and 5 TB s^{−1} of inter-chip bandwidth.

The system can process its 1.15 billion neurons 20 times faster than a human brain.

Loihi-based systems can perform inference and optimization using 100 times less energy at speeds as much as 50 times faster than CPU/GPU architectures.

Intel claims that Hala Point can create LLMs. Much further research is needed

== SpiNNaker ==
SpiNNaker (Spiking Neural Network Architecture) is a massively parallel, manycore supercomputer architecture designed by the Advanced Processor Technologies Research Group at the Department of Computer Science, University of Manchester.

== Criticism ==
Critics argue that a room-sized computer – as in the case of IBM's Watson – is not a viable alternative to a three-pound human brain. Some also cite the difficulty for a single system to bring so many elements together, such as the disparate sources of information as well as computing resources.

In 2021, The New York Times released Steve Lohr's article "What Ever Happened to IBM’s Watson?". He wrote about some costly failures of IBM Watson. One of them, a cancer-related project called the Oncology Expert Advisor, was abandoned in 2016 as a costly failure. During the collaboration, Watson could not use patient data. Watson struggled to decipher doctors’ notes and patient histories.

The development of LLMs has placed a new emphasis on cognitive computers, because the transformer-based technology that underpins LLMs demands huge energy for GPUs and PCs. Cognitive computers use significantly less energy, but the details of STDPs and neuron models cannot yet match the accuracy of backprop, and so ANN to SNN weight translations such as QAT and PQT or progressive quantization are becoming popular, with their own limitations.

== See also ==
- AI accelerator
- Cognitive computing
- Computational cognition
- Neuromorphic engineering
- Spiking neural network
- Tensor Processing Unit
- Turing test
