= Neuromorphic computing =

Integrated circuit technology

- Inventor: Carver Mead

Neuromorphic computing is a computing approach inspired by the human brain's structure and function. It uses artificial neurons to perform computations, mimicking neural systems for tasks such as perception, motor control, and multisensory integration. These systems, implemented in analog, digital, or mixed-mode VLSI, prioritize robustness, adaptability, and learning by emulating the brain’s distributed processing across small computing elements. This interdisciplinary field integrates biology, physics, mathematics, computer science, and electronic engineering to develop systems that emulate the brain’s morphology and computational strategies. Neuromorphic systems aim to enhance energy efficiency and computational power for applications including artificial intelligence, robotics, pattern recognition, and sensory processing.

== History ==
Carver Mead proposed one of the first applications for neuromorphic engineering in the late 1980s. In 2006, researchers at Georgia Tech developed a field programmable neural array, a silicon-based chip modeling neuron channel-ion characteristics. In 2011, MIT researchers created a chip mimicking synaptic communication using 400 transistors and standard CMOS techniques.

In 2012 HP Labs researchers reported that Mott memristors exhibit volatile behavior at low temperatures, enabling the creation of neuristors that mimic neuron behavior and support Turing machine components. Also in 2012, Purdue University researchers presented a neuromorphic chip design using lateral spin valves and memristors, noted for energy efficiency.

The 2013 Blue Brain Project creates detailed digital models of rodent brains.

Neurogrid, developed by Brains in Silicon at Stanford University, used 16 NeuroCore chips to emulate 65,536 neurons with high energy efficiency in 2014. The 2014 BRAIN Initiative and IBM’s TrueNorth chip contributed to neuromorphic advancements.

The 2016 BrainScaleS project, a hybrid neuromorphic supercomputer at University of Heidelberg, operated 864 times faster than biological neurons.

In 2017, Intel unveiled its Loihi chip, using an asynchronous artificial neural network for efficient learning and inference. Also in 2017 IMEC’s self-learning chip, based on OxRAM, demonstrated music composition by learning from minuets.

In 2018, the DYNAP-SE, a mixed-signal neuromorphic processor of four cores with 256 adaptive exponential integrate-and-fire neurons each, was developed at the Institute of Neuroinformatics, ETH Zurich and University of Zurich. It combines fast asynchronous event-based digital communication with analog circuits that emulate neuronal and synaptic dynamics at biologically realistic ms-timescales, enabling learning through real-time feedback.

In 2022, MIT researchers developed artificial synapses using protons for analog deep learning. In 2019, the European Union funded neuromorphic quantum computing to explore quantum operations using neuromorphic systems. Also in 2022, researchers at the Max Planck Institute for Polymer Research developed an organic artificial spiking neuron for in-situ neuromorphic sensing and biointerfacing.

Researchers reported in 2024 that chemical systems in liquid solutions can detect sound at various wavelengths, offering potential for neuromorphic applications.

Recently, Ferroelectric FETs have also been studied for their potential uses in emulating biological neurons in electronic circuits for extremely low energy consumption.

== Neurological inspiration ==
Neuromorphic engineering emulates the brain’s structure and operations, focusing on the analog nature of biological computation and the role of neurons in cognition. The brain processes information via neurons using chemical signals, abstracted into mathematical functions. Neuromorphic systems distribute computation across small elements, similar to neurons, using methods guided by anatomical and functional neural maps from electron microscopy and neural connection studies.

== Implementation ==
Neuromorphic systems employ hardware such as oxide-based memristors, spintronic memories, threshold switches, and transistors. Software implementations train spiking neural networks using error backpropagation.

=== Neuromemristive systems ===
Neuromemristive systems use memristors to implement neuroplasticity, focusing on abstract neural network models rather than detailed biological mimicry. These systems could enable applications in speech recognition, face recognition, and object recognition, and can replace conventional digital logic gates. Memristors can be used in neuron circuits for both single-layer and multilayer perceptron based learning algorithms. The Caravelli-Traversa-Di Ventra equation describes memristive memory evolution, revealing tunneling phenomena and Lyapunov functions.

=== Neuromorphic sensors ===
Neuromorphic principles extend to sensors, such as the retinomorphic sensor or event camera, which mimic human vision by registering brightness changes individually, optimizing power consumption.

An example of this applied to detecting light is the retinomorphic sensor or, when employed in an array, an event camera.

== Ethical considerations ==
Neuromorphic systems raise the same ethical questions as those for other approaches to artificial intelligence. Daniel Lim argued that advanced neuromorphic systems could lead to machine consciousness, raising concerns about whether civil rights and other protocols should be extended to them. Legal debates, such as in Acohs Pty Ltd v. Ucorp Pty Ltd, question ownership of work produced by neuromorphic systems, as non-human-generated outputs may not be copyrightable.

== See also ==
- AI accelerator
- Artificial brain
- Biomorphic
- Cognitive computer
- Computation and Neural Systems
- Differentiable programming
- Event camera
- Hardware for artificial intelligence
- Lithionics
- Neuromorphic olfaction systems
- Neurorobotics
- Optical flow sensor
- Physical neural network
- SpiNNaker
- SyNAPSE
- Retinomorphic sensor
- Unconventional computing
- Vision chip
- Vision processing unit
- Wetware computer
- Zeroth (software)
