= Bionic architecture =

Contemporary architetonic movement

Bionic architecture is a contemporary movement that studies the physiological, behavioural, and structural adaptions of biological organisms as a source of inspiration for designing and constructing expressive buildings. These structures are designed to be self-sufficient, being able to structurally modify themselves in response to the fluctuating internal and external forces such as changes in weather and temperature.

Although this style of architecture has existed since the early 18th century period, the movement only began to mature in the early 21st century, following society's growing concerns over climate change and global warming. These influences led to bionic architecture being used to draw society away from its anthropocentric environment, by creating landscapes that allow for the harmonious relationship between nature and society. This is achieved through having an in-depth understanding of the complex interactions between form, material, and structure in order to ensure that the building's design supports a more sustainable environment. As a result, architects will rely upon the use of high-tech, artificial materials and techniques in order to conserve energy and materials, lower the consumption of construction and increase the practicality and reliability of their building structures.

== History and theoretical framework ==
The term 'bionic architecture' is derived from the Greek word 'bios' (life) as well as the English word 'technics' (to study). The term was originally used to describe the scientific trend of 'transferring technologies into life-forms'. The term 'bionic' was first used in 1958 by U.S. army colonel, Jack E. Steele and Soviet scientist, Otto Schmitt during an astronomy project that focused on research surrounding the field of robotics. In their project, both researchers initially recognised the concept of bionics as 'the science of systems based on living creatures'. The idea was then expanded upon in 1997 by Janine Benyus, who coined the term 'bio mimicry' which referred to 'the conscious emulation of nature's genius'.

In 1974, Victor Glushkov published his book The Encyclopedia of Cybernetics, in which the study of bionics was applied to architectural thinking, and claimed that: "In recent years, another new scientific direction has emerged in which bionics collaborates with architecture and building technics, namely architectural bionics. Using models of nature as samples, such as plant stems, living leaf nerve, eggshells, engineers create durable and beautiful architectural structures: houses, bridges, movie theatres, etc." Later, J.S Lebedev published his book, Architecture and Bionic in 1983 and focused on the classical theory of architecture. It explored the possibility of studying the behaviours of different biological life forms and integrating these observations into building and design. He also theorised that bionic architecture would solve many problems associated with design and construction because it would allow for the 'perfect protection' through mimicking the same survival mechanisms used by organisms. By the late 1980s, architectural bionics finally emerged as a new branch of architectural science and practice. This then influenced the creation of the Central Research and Experimental Design Laboratory of Architectural Bionics, which became the main research centre for the field of bionic architecture in the USSR and a number of socialist countries.

== Purpose ==
The built environment contributes to a majority of waste, material production, energy use and fossil fuel emissions. Thus, there is a responsibility to develop a more efficient and ecologically friendly construction design that still allows for daily activities in society to take place. This is achieved through the use of renewable energy sources such as solar power, wind energy, hydro power, and natural sources such as wood, soil and minerals.

In her book, Biomimicry: Innovation Inspired by Nature (1997), Janine Benyus formulated a set of questions that can be used to establish the level of bio mimicry within an architectural design. In order to ensure that an architectural design follows the principles of bionics, the answer must be 'yes' to the following questions:

- Does its precedent relate to nature?
- Is it solar-powered?
- Is it self-sufficient?
- Does it fit form to function?
- Is it sustainable?
- Is it beautiful?

=== Styles of bionic architecture ===
The classifications of bionic architecture are:

- Arch form structure: inspired by an animal's spinal column, thereby creating a more stiff and rigid building.
- Thin shell structure: inspired by various crustaceans and skulls due to its ability to distribute internal force across its surface area. Buildings that employ this style are malleable and flexible.
- Puffing structure: inspired by plant and animal cells. It is mainly used for aesthetic purposes.
- Spiral structure: inspired by plantain leaves and its ability to regulate sunlight. Buildings with this design have the most abundant sunlight.

== Historical evolution ==
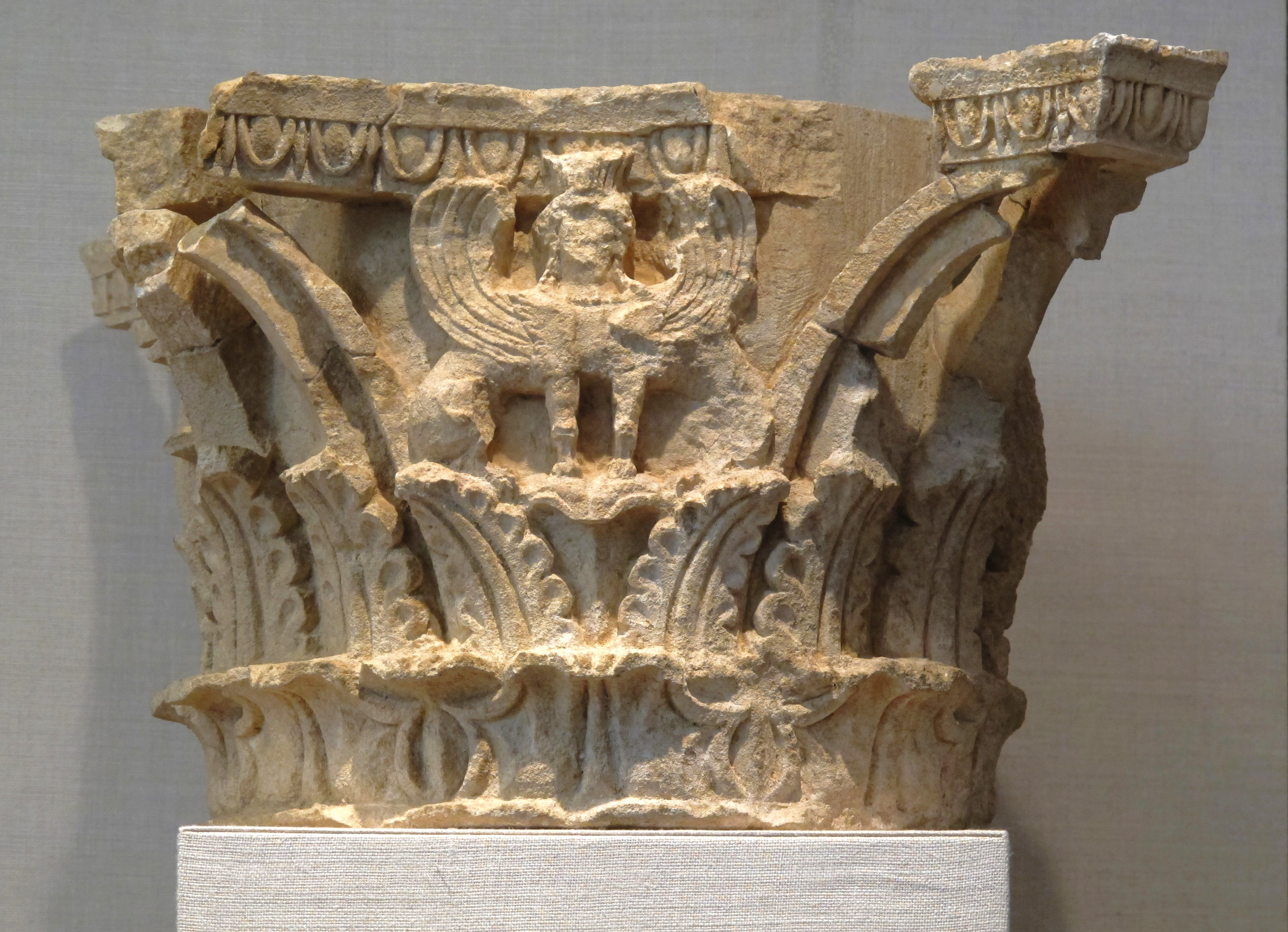
A piece of the Corinthian column capital which is decorated with acanthus leaves

=== Pre-18th Century Period ===
Archaeological data suggests that the first forms of bionic architecture can be traced back to ancient Greece and was primarily focused upon anatomical observations. This is because the Greeks were fascinated by the features of the human body, which influenced the symmetrical design of their architecture. Bionic architecture can also be observed through their use of plant elements within their stucco mouldings. This idea was said to have originated from one of Polykleitos' students, who observed the acanthus leaves decorated on a Corinthian grave. This provided inspiration for the Corinthian column capital's design, which was surrounded by an acanthus foliage.

=== 18th–19th century period ===
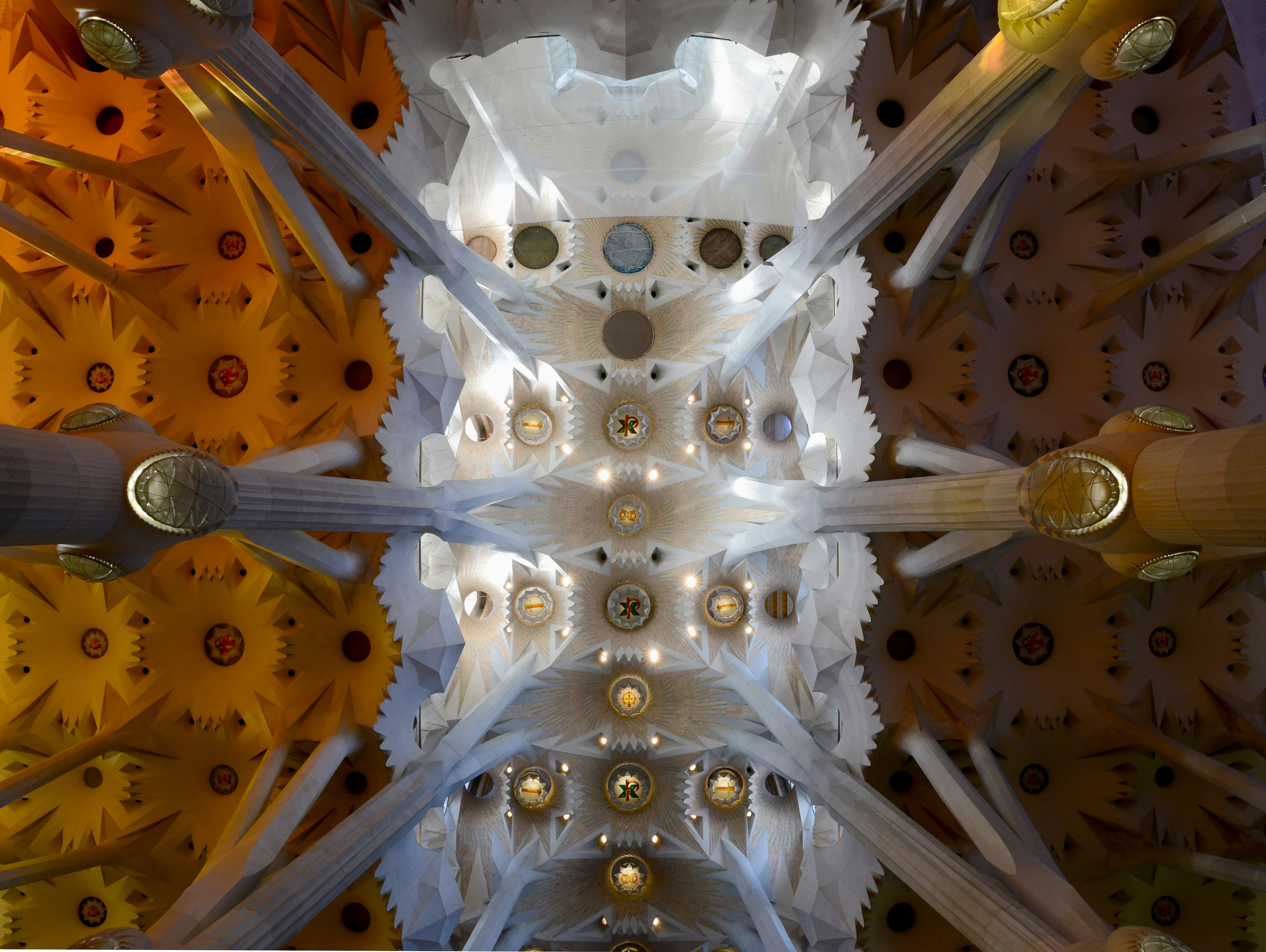
The ceiling of the 'Sagrada Familia', with patterns that mirror the shapes of flowers

Following the rise of the Industrial Revolution, many theorists became concerned with the underlying implications of modern, technological advancements and thus, re-explored the idea of 'nature-centred architecture'. Most bionic architectures built during this era can be seen drawing away from the common iron construction and instead, exploring more futuristic styles. For example, Antonio Gaudi's Sagrada Familia's interior design drew its inspiration from various shapes and patterns of plants while its pillars mirrored the structure of human bones. Such influences were based on Gaudi's realisation of the potential for mimicking nature in order to enhance the functionality of his buildings. Joseph Paxton's, Crystal Palace also uses lattice grids in order to mimic the human bone structure and thus, create a more rigid structure. The Crystal Palace has also imitated the vein tissues found in water lilies and the human thighbone. This reduced the building's surface tension, thereby allowing it to carry more weight without the use of an excessive amount of materials.

=== 20th–21st century period ===
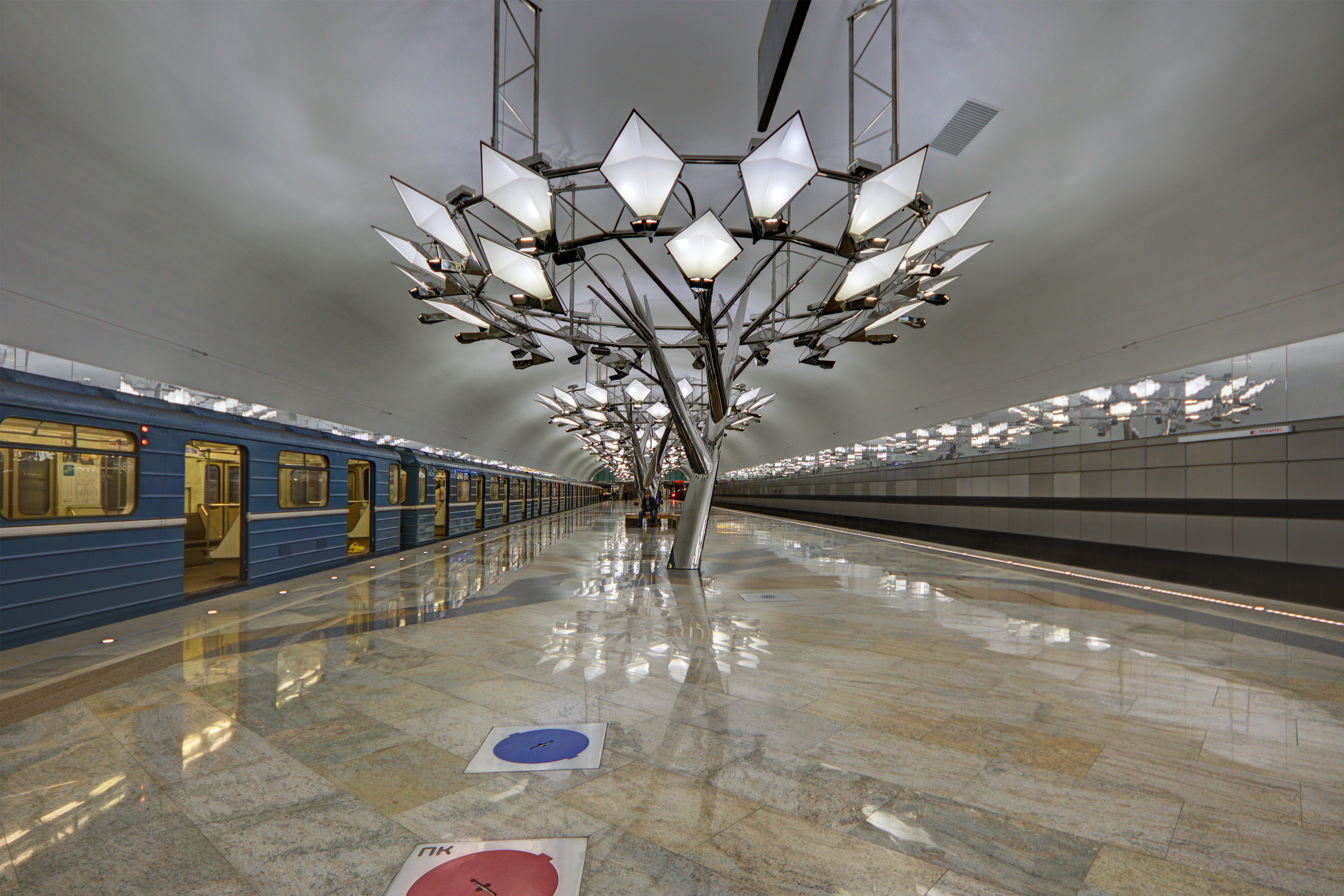
Artificial trees with "leaves" of light, Troparyovo metro station

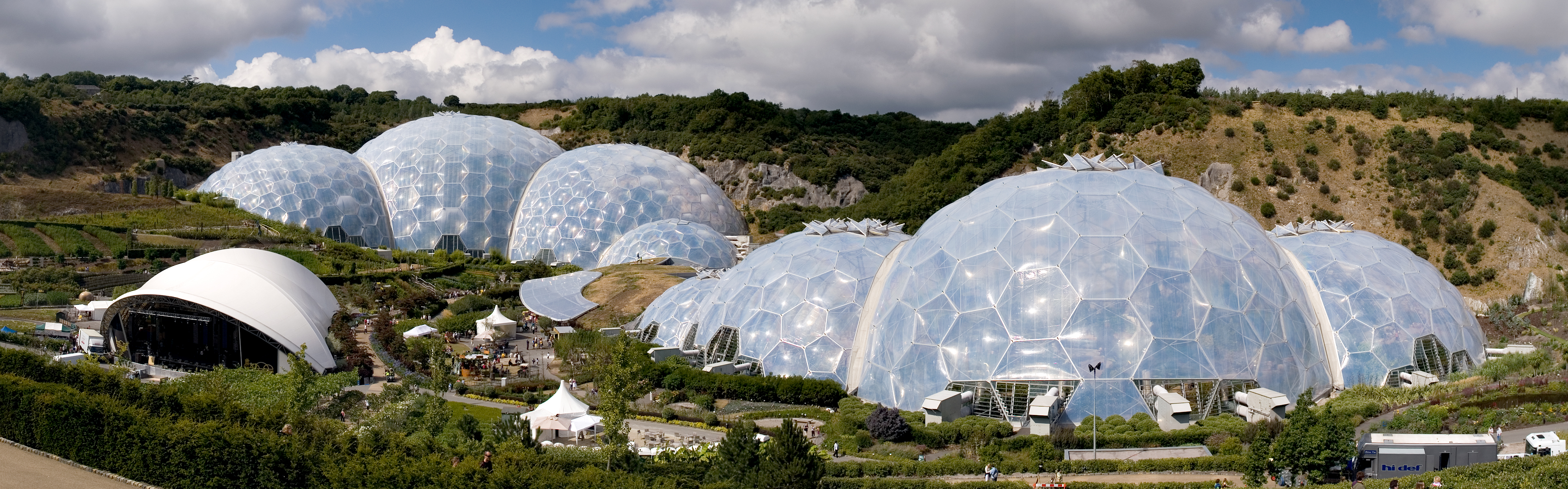
'The Eden Project', which has solar-powered domes

Due to growing concerns surrounding global warming and climate change, as well as the rise of technological improvements, architectural bionics became primarily focused on more efficient ways to achieve modern sustainability. An example of the modern architectural bionic movement includes the 30 St Mary Axe (2003), which is heavily inspired by the 'Venus Flower Basket Sponge', a sea creature with a lattice-like exoskeleton and round shape that disperses force from water currents. The building's design features an aluminium coated steel diagrid structure. This allows for passive cooling, heating, ventilating and lighting. Nicholas Grimshaw's, The Eden Project (2001) features a set of natural biomes with several geodesic domes inspired by bubbles joined. These are made of three layers of Ethylene Tetrafluoroethylene (ETFE), a form of plastic that provides a lighter steel frame and allows for more sunlight to enter the building in order to generate solar power. Its pillows are also built to be easily detachable from its steel frame should more efficient material be discovered in the future.

== Evaluation ==
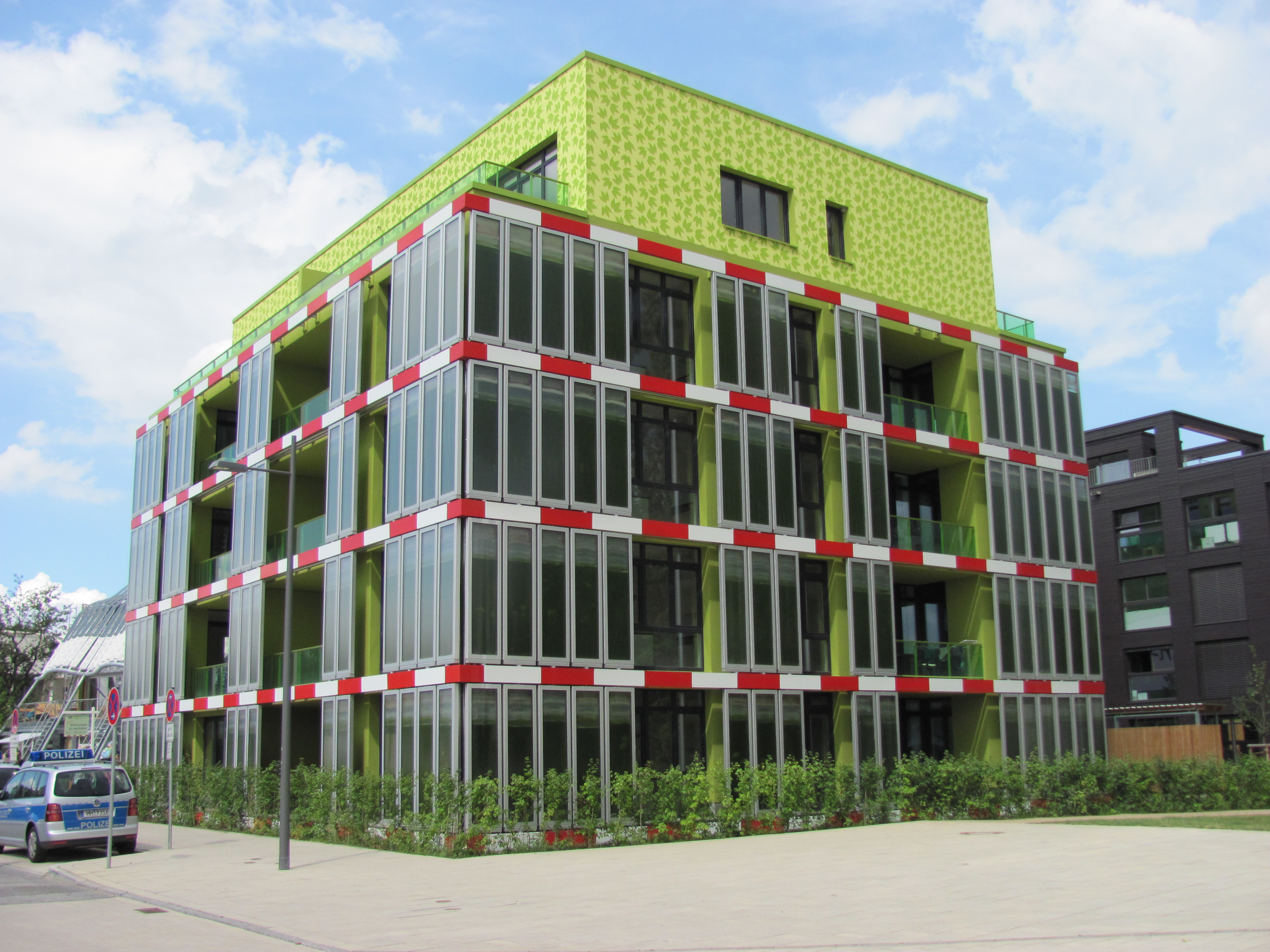
The BIQ House located in Hamburg, Germany

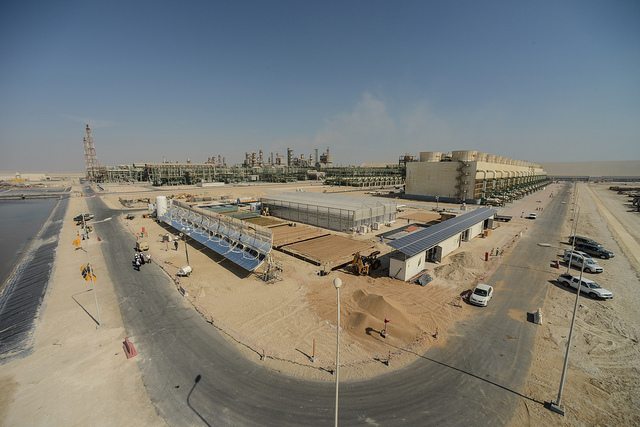
The Sahara Forest Project in development

=== Advantages ===
The main advantage of bionic architecture is that it allows for a more sustainable living environment through its reliance upon using renewable materials. This allows for an increase in monetary savings due to the increased energy efficiency. For example:

- The BIQ (Bio-Intelligent Quotient) House in Germany was designed by Splitterwerk Architects and SSC Strategic Science Consultants. It is completely powered by algae. It features a heat exchanger which cultivates micro algae within its glass panels in order to be used as a resource for providing the building with energy and warmth. This produces zero carbon electricity, which is twice as effective as photovoltaics.
- The Sahara Forest Project in Tunisia is a greenhouse project that is heavily inspired by the Namibian fog-basking beetle, which can regulate its body temperature and develop its own fresh water in arid climates. Like the beetle, this building features a saltwater evaporating, cooling and humidifying system that is suitable for year-round cultivation. The evaporated air condenses to fresh water, allowing the greenhouse to remain heated at night.. The salt extracted from the evaporation process can also be crystallised into calcium carbonate and sodium chloride, which can be compressed into building blocks, thereby minimising waste.

=== Disadvantages ===
Bionic architecture has been heavily criticised for being difficult to maintain due to its tendency to be overly technical. For example:

- The East Gate Centre in Harare, Zimbabwe had to follow a strict set of rules during its creation. Its engineers claimed that the outer walls must not be under direct sunlight, the window to wall ratio must be approximately 25% and the windows must be sealed with ventilation, in order to combat noise pollution and unpredictable weather.

== Future use ==
With the rise of technological advancements, the full potential of Bionic Architecture is still being explored. However, due to the rapidly growing demand for a more effective, ecologically sustainable design approach that does not compromise the needs of society, many ideas have been put forth:

=== Ocean Scraper 2050 ===
This essentially involves creating floating buildings inspired by the buoyancy of icebergs and the shapes of various organisms. In particular, its internal structure will be based on the shape of beehives and micropal-radiolares in order to house different residential and office spaces. Its proposed design allows for the building to be self-sufficient and sustainable as it will aim to generate energy from various sources such as wind, biomass, solar energy, hydro energy and geothermal energy. Moreover, as the ocean scraper is intended to be built on water, its designers are exploring the idea of extracting and generating electricity from new sources such as under-water volcanoes and earthquake power.

=== Supercentre Beehive Concept ===
This idea explores the possibility of creating an area that requires less travel time between places, thereby reducing the amount of fossil fuel emissions and CO_{2} pollution. As this design is meant for sites that are 'already a large hub for activity', it will particularly be useful for high schools, colleges and grocery stores. The architectural design is also very compact and aims to increase the amount of green area, thereby allowing for the full advantage of space.

=== Pod Housing Units ===
This idea focuses upon creating a set of interconnected living units that 'can be networked together in order to share and benefit from one another's utilities'. The design is also intended to be self-sustaining and can be changed based on the needs of the user. For example, the roof can be modified to be slanted in order to collect solar energy, pitched to collect rainwater, or smoothed in order to allow for better airflow.

== Related terms ==
- Bionics
- Eco-tech
- Organi-tech
- Bio-tech
- Biourbanism

== Architects of Bionic architecture ==
- Greg Lynn
- Bates Smart
- Nicholas Grimshaw
- Santiago Calatrava
- Ken Yeang
- Daniel Libeskind
- Jan Kaplický
- Moti Bodek
- Cecil Balmond
- Vincent Callebaut
- Jacques Rougerie (architect)
