= UNBROKEN Center =

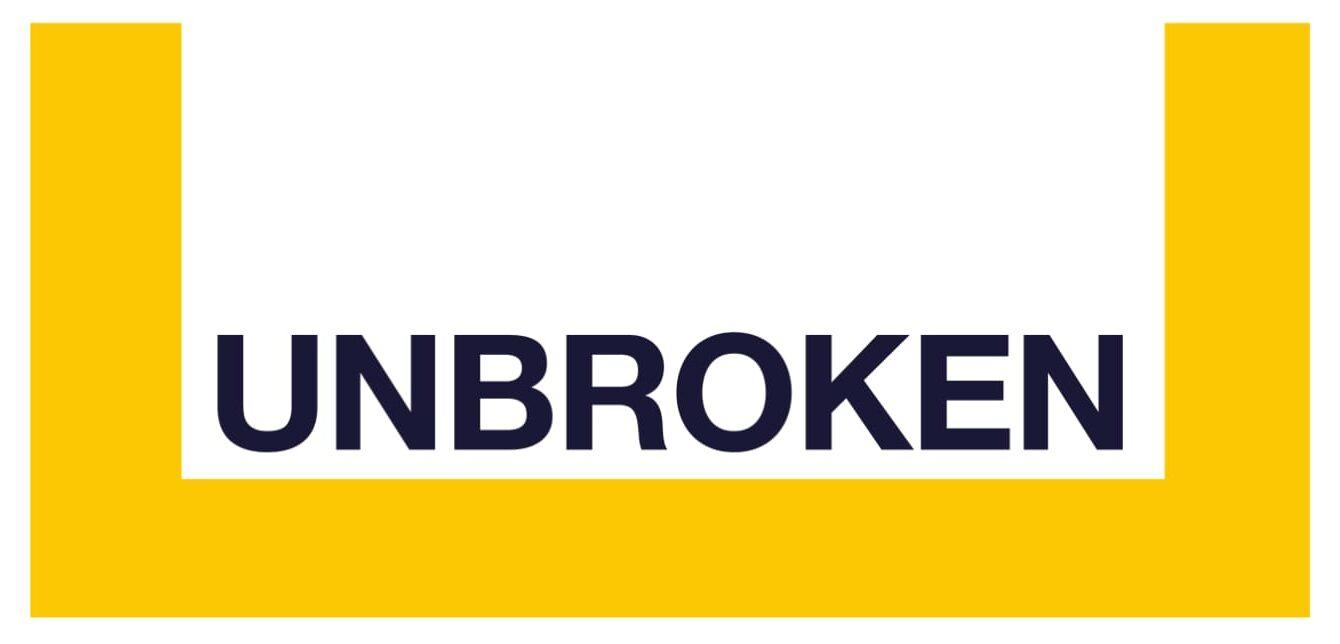

Geography
- Location: Hetmana Mazepy St 25д, Lviv Oblast, Ukraine

Organisation
- Network: First Lviv Medical Union

History
- Opened: 2022

Links
- Website: https://unbroken.org.ua/
- Lists: Hospitals in Ukraine

The UNBROKEN Center or UNBROKEN National Rehabilitation Center is a Ukrainian medical and rehabilitation centre in Lviv that treats soldiers and civilians, including children, affected by Russia’s full-scale invasion of Ukraine.

== History ==
UNBROKEN Center was created in Lviv after Russia’s full-scale invasion, when the city became a major rear-area humanitarian and medical hub for displaced and wounded Ukrainians. Work on the new hospital and rehabilitation complex began shortly after the invasion, and within several months UNBROKEN was established as a rehabilitation centre for victims of the war; it initially treated large numbers of injured civilians and later increasingly focused on wounded soldiers with complex trauma, amputations, burns, brain injuries and other war-related injuries.

The center was developed on the basis of the Lviv First Medical Union, and in April 2023, with the participation of Lviv mayor Andrii Sadovyi, a former polyclinic block was opened as a modern rehabilitation building, after Lviv had hosted more than five million displaced people and over 11,000 wounded persons.

== Services ==
The center is reportedly the largest medical facility in Ukraine and offers a full cycle of care, including emergency treatment, reconstructive surgery, orthopaedics, prosthetics, physical rehabilitation and psychological support, and states that it had treated more than 20,000 wounded Ukrainians, including 360 children. Its prosthetics and orthotics centre is integrated into the First Lviv Territorial Medical Union, a municipal multidisciplinary hospital, a model intended to combine medical, rehabilitation and technical work in one treatment pathway.

UNBROKEN has been covered by international media as part of the wider response to Ukraine’s large number of war-related amputations and traumatic injuries. The center specializes in bionic and prosthetic limbs, providing them for free to soldiers injured by Russian attacks. Bionic limbs offered by UNBROKEN include products from Ottobock (Germany), Össur (Iceland), Levitate (Denmark), Aether Biomedical (Poland) and Ukrainian startup Esper Bionics.

== Funding ==
The center receives extensive international funding, grants, and medical equipment from foreign governments, charities, banks, and corporate donors, including the government of Taiwan which donated over €5 million to construct a new medical and rehabilitation facility on the campus, Direct Relief which awarded a $1 million grant, or the European Bank for Reconstruction and Development which matched a JustGiving crowdfunding campaign.

== See also ==
- Superhumans Center
