= Aurora (chain) =

"one dollar" store chain in Ukraine

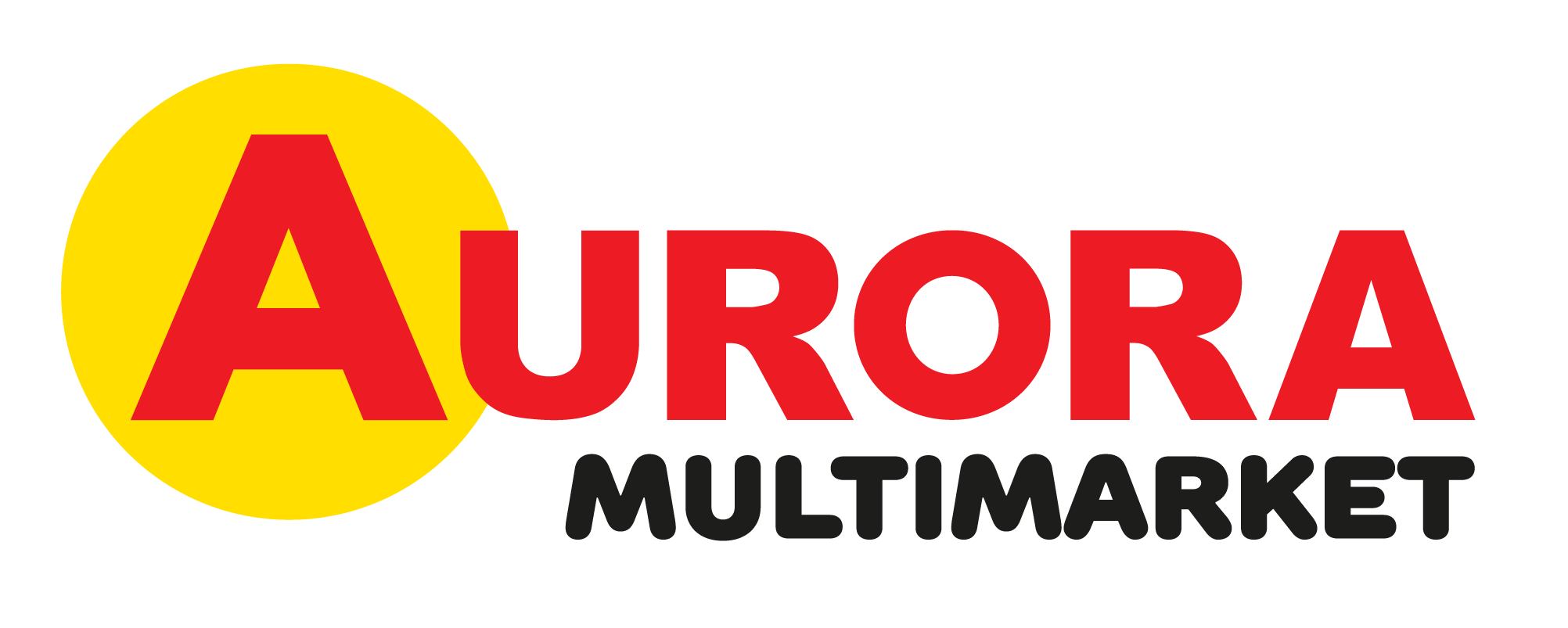
- Industry: Retail
- Founded: 2011
- Headquarters: Ukraine 3-B Sviato-Mykhailivska Street, Opishnia, Poltava Oblast
- Number of locations: 1800+ shops (Ukraine)
- Owner: Lev Zhydenko, Taras Panasenko, Lesia Klymenko, an American foundation Horizon Capital
- Website: https://avrora.ua/

Aurora is a chain of shops specialising in selling goods at affordable prices. As of May 2026, the 'Aurora' chain of supermarkets comprises over 1,873 stores in Ukraine.

== History ==
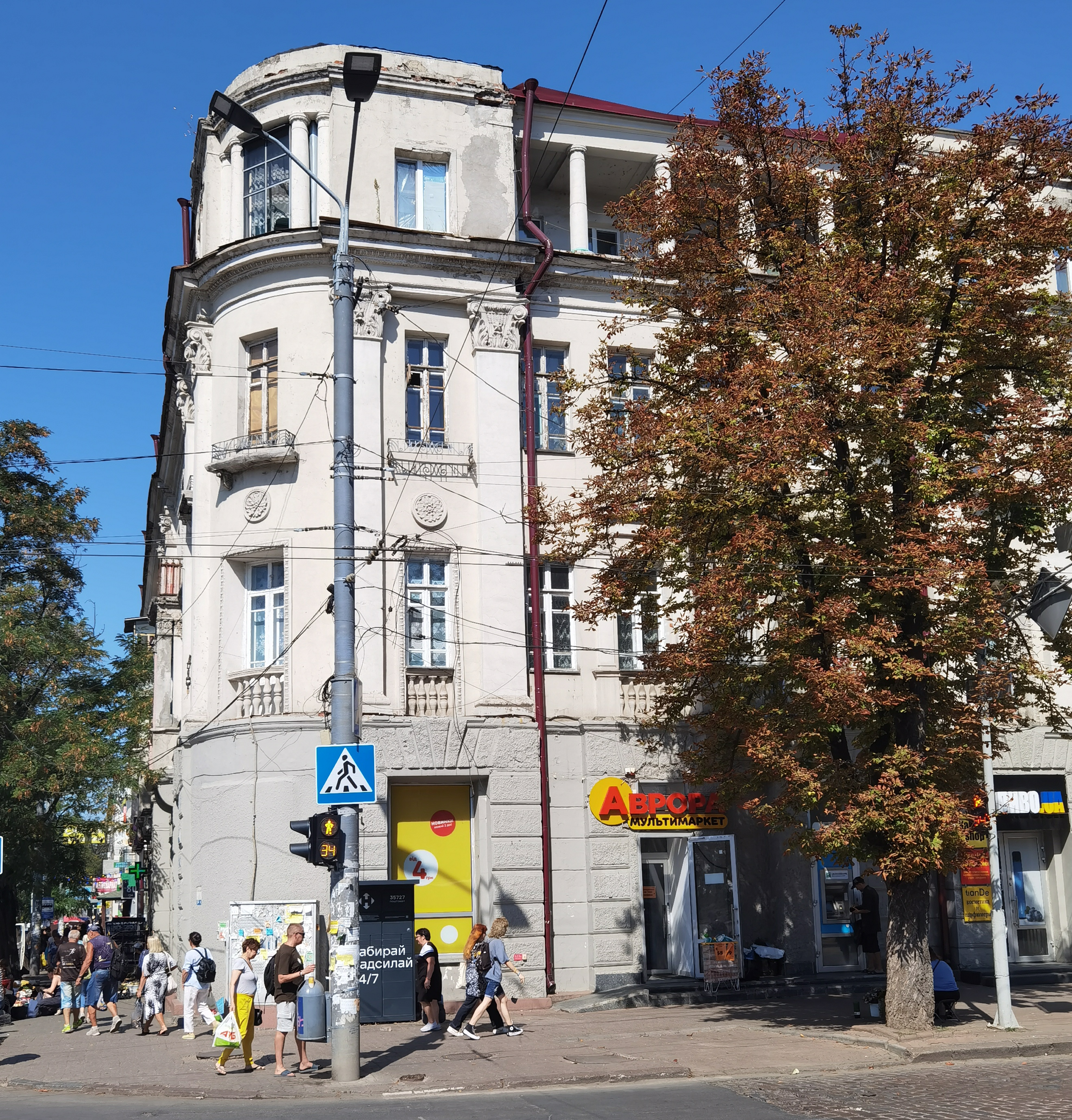
Aurora shop in a historic building

The idea of opening stores with low-price goods originated with Taras Panasenko, who, during his studies, visited the United States through the Work & Travel programme and encountered similar retail concepts there. The concept appealed to Lev Zhydenko, at whose company Panasenko was employed at the time. In February 2011, the first store of the chain opened in Poltava. By 2015, the network had expanded to 100 stores.

In 2012, stores opened under the new name "Khvatai. All for 5, 10, 15". Within a year of operation, the chain expanded to five stores.

In 2013, the chain was rebranded as "Ya Liubliu Avroru" ("I Love Aurora").

In 2021, the Aurora multimarket chain received an investment from Horizon Capital's EEGF III fund, which facilitated the further development of the business.

In 2022, as a result of the full-scale Russian invasion, the chain lost more than 200 stores.

On 24 June 2023, the chain's 1,000th store in Ukraine opened in Ivano-Frankivsk. The opening was attended by CEO Taras Panasenko, who symbolically made the first purchase.

In August 2023, Aurora received an award from Ukrainian president Volodymyr Zelenskyy in recognition of its support for the charitable initiatives of the fundraising platform United24.

In September 2024, the chain opened its 1,500th store in the city of Starokostiantyniv. During 2025, 235 new stores were opened. At the end of 2025, Aurora received the status of Authorised Economic Operator (AEO), which grants customs benefits to expedite logistics.

As of February 2026, more than 1,800 Aurora stores are operating across Ukraine, with the company employing over 16,000 people.

== Product range and store formats ==
The product range is shaped by demand for affordable everyday goods.

Aurora stores feature a compact format offering items such as personal hygiene products, decorative cosmetics, kitchenware, textiles, pet supplies, food and beverages, children's goods, electronics and accessories, household chemicals, and more.

For customer convenience, stores are equipped with self-checkout terminals and price checkers manufactured in-house by Aurora, which allow shoppers to check the price of an item and access additional product information.

In 2021, Aurora opened its first pilot MAXI-format store in Kryvyi Rih. Stores of this format occupy a floor area of 400 m^{2} or more and bring together a beauty zone, a children's section, a quick-service food offer, and general retail under one roof.

== Support for Ukrainian manufacturers ==
More than 600 of Aurora's partners are Ukrainian producers, and approximately 50% of the goods sold across the chain are of Ukrainian origin. The network continues to expand the share of domestically manufactured products in its stores. Under the "Aurora for Entrepreneurs" grant programme, ten small and medium-sized businesses each received 1 million hryvnias to support development in the processing industry.

In 2021, the company transitioned its suppliers to electronic document management and launched an online platform providing access to reports, materials, and updates. This streamlined the ordering and dispatch process and enabled partners to monitor sales in real time through a dedicated account portal.

== Investment projects ==
In the first half of 2025, Aurora commenced the reconstruction of the WestGate logistics complex in Stoianka, outside Kyiv — a facility that had been completely destroyed by Russian forces in 2022.

As of September 2025, the Aurora network operates four distribution centres and two logistics hubs.

In 2023, Aurora launched its own solar power stations at distribution centres in Vinnytsia and Poltava. As of July 2025, the total investment amounts to 26 million hryvnias, with the solar panels having generated savings of 12 million hryvnias over two years.

== Public activities ==
Aurora is a member of the American Chamber of Commerce in Ukraine (ACC), the European Business Association (EBA), and the Ukrainian Retailers Association (RAU).

In 2023, Aurora jointly with Diia.Business launched the educational grant programme "Traiektoriia" ("Trajectory"), aimed at supporting veterans. Participants receive training, consultations with experts, and the opportunity to obtain a grant of 100,000 hryvnias for business development. In 2025, Aurora together with Diia.Business and partners launched the second wave of the programme, "Traiektoriia 2". Ten participants advanced to the final, with the winners receiving 20 million hryvnias for business development.

In 2024, the company became a signatory to the Women's Empowerment Principles (WEPs) — an international initiative of the UN Global Compact and UN Women.

In 2025, Aurora ranked among the top three finalists of the WEPs Awards in the Sustainable Impact Award 2025 category.

== Charitable and social projects ==
The Aurora network implements charitable initiatives aimed at supporting the Ukrainian Defence Forces, veterans, rehabilitation, and adaptive sports. Since the beginning of the full-scale invasion, the company has contributed 800 million hryvnias to charitable causes (as of February 2026).

The company runs mentorship programmes, employee training sessions, and veteran reintegration and civilian adaptation events. Within the framework of the programme, 50 finalists received grants of 100,000 hryvnias each for the establishment or development of their own businesses. The "Traiektoriia" programme was awarded the gold prize at the Partnership for Sustainability Award 2024 in the Economic Development category.

In partnership with the national rehabilitation centre Superhumans Center and other organisations, Aurora supports the physical and emotional recovery of veterans and promotes the development of adaptive sports. A nationwide adaptive sports tour supported by the company brought together more than 1,200 participants across various cities of Ukraine.

The company regularly supports charitable initiatives, volunteer fundraising drives, and socially significant projects, including UNITED24, Repower, "Come Back Alive", Superhumans, and "Zemliachky". Notable fundraising results include 6.7 million hryvnias raised through the "Nezlamnyi Donat" campaign; 24 million hryvnias for the "Night Hell for the Enemy" project; and 5 million hryvnias for drones at the Atlas United24 festival.

Aurora also provided financial assistance to UNITED24 for the reconstruction of the home of Sashko from Mykolaiv Oblast, who became the subject of an Imagine Dragons music video.

The company organises regular blood donation days for its employees, through which more than 2,500 blood donations have been collected, helping to save over 5,400 lives. Aurora's corporate donor base numbers more than 750 people.

The company also supports the training of Ukrainian military personnel in tactical medicine and provides instruction in accordance with Tactical Combat Casualty Care (TCCC) standards.

In May 2025, Aurora began supporting the Repower foundation, directing funds towards psychological recovery programmes for military medics and veterans of the Armed Forces of Ukraine.

In July of the same year, the company donated 2,780,000 hryvnias to the "Mriia" charitable foundation for the financial and educational support of children of killed, captured, and missing defenders of Ukraine. In September, a joint campaign by Aurora and the "Come Back Alive" foundation raised more than 7.3 million hryvnias for the procurement of equipment for demining units.

By the end of 2025, Aurora's total systemic contributions to the Superhumans Center for the rehabilitation and prosthetics of Ukrainian military personnel exceeded 70 million hryvnias.

In January 2026, as part of the "Moie Ridne Rizdvo" ("My Native Christmas") charitable project, the company together with the NGO "Zemliachky" raised 10 million hryvnias for the custom tailoring of winter uniforms for women serving in the Armed Forces of Ukraine.

== Educational and cultural projects ==
Aurora's total investment in educational programmes from 2022 to July 2025 amounts to more than 90 million hryvnias.

Aurora initiated the teaching of economics in schools. The "Economic Literacy for All" project, implemented in partnership with the Kakha Bendukidze Free Economy Centre, is aimed at promoting economic knowledge. In 2024, 33 teachers completed the training, and the number of participants in the economics olympiad grew to more than 9,300.

In 2021, the company joined the "Youth Will Change Ukraine" programme in Poltava Oblast, implemented in collaboration with the Bohdan Havrylyshyn Family Foundation. The programme helps young people acquire project management skills, drive change in their communities, and develop their own initiatives. Over two years of participation, 12 projects received funding for implementation or the opportunity to study abroad.

In 2025, the Avrora Students school was launched as a platform for motivated and initiative-driven young people seeking to learn, develop, and build careers.

Among the company's principal educational initiatives is support for the National Economics Olympiad. Aurora has donated more than 15,000 copies of educational textbooks to schools and contributes to prize funds for outstanding pupils.

Aurora collaborates with the Institute of International Relations of Taras Shevchenko National University of Kyiv, the Lviv National Academy of Arts, Igor Sikorsky Kyiv Polytechnic Institute, the Ukrainian Students Association, the Kakha Bendukidze Free Economy Centre, AIESEC in Ukraine, the Ukrainian Catholic University, the Zminotvortsi system, GoGlobal, and others.

The company conducts lectures for students, soft skills development training, and has launched a youth education programme.

== Awards ==
- 2023: award from President of Ukraine Volodymyr Zelenskyy in recognition of support for the charitable initiatives of the United24 platform.
- 2023–2024: award in the "Sales Dynamics" category at the XV International Conference "Food&NonFoodMaster".
- 2024: Aurora co-founders Lev Zhydenko and Taras Panasenko were named Entrepreneurs of the Year by Forbes Ukraine.
- 2025: Lev Zhydenko and Taras Panasenko won in the Innovation Excellence category at the EY "Entrepreneur of the Year 2025" national competition in Ukraine.
- 2025: Lev Zhydenko and Taras Panasenko were included in NV's list of "100 Ukrainians Changing the Country".
- 2025: at the X-Ray competition by MMR, Aurora received the Innovation of the Year award for the "Celebrity Voice-Over for the Self-Checkout" project, and won in the "Best Marketing Team" category.
- 2025: Aurora received the "Promotion of Business Integrity" commendation.
- 2025: Aurora was included in Forbes Ukraine's Top 30 Most Veteran-Friendly Companies.
- 2025: Aurora co-founder Taras Panasenko ranked first in Forbes Ukraine's Top 25 CEOs.
- 2025: Aurora won in the "Most Dynamic Retailer of the Year" category at the RAU Awards.
- 2025: Bronze at EFFIE Awards Ukraine 2025 for the "Shablya Mazepy" ("Mazepa's Sabre") case, developed jointly with the NGO "Ukraine Wow".
