= Aether Biomedical =

Company in Poznań, Poland

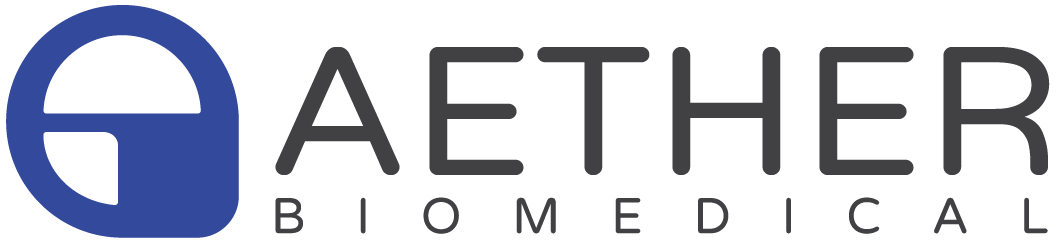
- Type: Spółka z o.o.
- Industry: Health care
- Founded: 2018
- Headquarters: Poznań, Poland
- Area served: Global
- Key people: Dhruv Agrawal (Co-Founder and CEO); Faith Jiwakhan (CCO)
- Products: Bionic prostheses
- Revenue: US $19.1 million (2026)
- Number of employees: 68 (2026)
- Website: www.aetherbiomedical.com

Aether Biomedical is a Polish-based medical robotics company developing upper-limb prosthetic technology, best known for the Zeus bionic hand.

== History ==
The company was started in 2018 in India by entrepreneurs from New Delhi, Dhruv Agrawal and Faith Jiwakhan, but moved to Poznań which they saw as offering the best conditions for development.

The company has its U.S. headquarters in Chicago.

As of October 2021 Aether's products were available in 12 EU Member States and in Asia. As of November 2024 Aether Biomedical was the only manufacturer of bionic hand prostheses in Poland.

In 2024 Forbes included Agrawal and Jiwakhan on its 30 Under 30 list in the Europe - Science & Healthcare category, reporting the company had sold more than 400 Zeus units up to that point.

Agrawal was called a "visionary in the field of modern medical technology" by some Polish media, citing the Zeus as helping Ukrainian war veterans regain their ability to function.

In September 2024 The Economic Times noted that Aether played a key role in the success of the Superhumans Center in Lviv, Ukraine's leading medical facility treating victims of the Russo-Ukrainian war, having provided 70 bionic arms to amputees at the center as of then.

== Funding ==
Aether Biomedical has raised €15 million in funding from venture capital firms, with PLN 14 million funding coming from US funds and Chiratae Ventures. In 2018 it received the PLN 100 thousand Poland Prize from Brinc Polska, which enabled moving the company to Poznań. It has received grants from the Polish government via the National Centre for Research and Development (PLN 2.4 million), Polish Agency for Enterprise Development (PLN 1.77 million), and various European Union funds (over PLN 38 million).

== Activity in Ukraine ==
After Russia’s full-scale invasion of Ukraine, Aether Biomedical became involved in supplying bionic hands free of charge to Ukrainian amputees, including wounded soldiers and civilians. It collaborates with Superhumans Center and UNBROKEN Center clinics in Lviv as well as the Open Dialogue Foundation. For Superhumans the cooperation forms a part of its response to the shortage of upper-limb prosthetics specialists in Ukraine, combining device delivery with clinical missions and training for Ukrainian prosthetists. The stated goal of the partnership with the Open Dialogue Foundation was to enable Ukrainian veterans and civilians receive a bionic hand free of charge, with the product being considered uniquely suited for wartime conditions by some media outlets. As of November 2025 it was the first and only bionic hand fully reimbursed by the Ukrainian state.

Aether supplied dozens of bionic arms for Ukrainian amputees through Superhumans, including around 70 installations in Lviv by late 2024 and more than 140 fittings in Ukraine over a subsequent 12-month period.

== See also ==
- Ottobock
- Superhumans Center
- UNBROKEN Center
- Open Dialogue Foundation
