= Samantha Payne =

English entrepreneur

Samantha Joanne Payne MBE is an English entrepreneur. The co-founder of Open Bionics, a bionics company developing affordable prosthetics for children, Payne has won a number of international awards for her work. These include the MIT Technology Review 'Innovators under 35' in 2018, James Dyson gong for innovative engineering and Wired Innovation Fellow in 2016. In the Queen's Birthday Honours list 2020, Payne was awarded an MBE, for her work making bionic technology more accessible.

== Early life and education ==
Born and raised in Knowle West, outside of Bristol, England. Payne is a graduate of Whitworth University and has a Bachelor of Arts/Science.

== Career ==
She worked as a journalist, specialising in technology before becoming a co-founder of Open Bionics. In 2013, whilst working as a journalist, Payne interviewed Joel Gibbard, who was a robotics graduate at the time. Gibbard and Payne later became business partners and co-founders of Open Bionics.

Payne and Gibbard founded Open Bionics in 2014. The start-up was initially based at the Technology Business Incubator at Bristol Robotics Laboratory. The aim of the company was to develop "affordable, assistive devices that enhance the human body."

Open Bionics has partnered with Disney to make prosthetics based on Disney characters for children.

Her work at Open Bionics has been featured in The Guardian and Daily Mirror.

== Innovation ==
Open Bionics uses 3D scanning to take the initial prosthetic fitting and 3D printing to improve the prosthetic design. These innovations significantly reduce the build-time and the material costs for a personalised hand, making prosthetics more affordable for amputees. Payne estimates that, if bought from private providers, bionic hands with multi-grip functionality cost up to £60,000, compared to £5,000 from Open Bionics.

== Awards and recognition ==
In 2015, Payne was shortlisted for Women in Business 'Young Entrepreneur of The Year' award. In 2018, Payne featured on the Forbes 30 Under 30 list in the Sciences and Healthcare category.
