= Hans Georg Näder =

German merchant

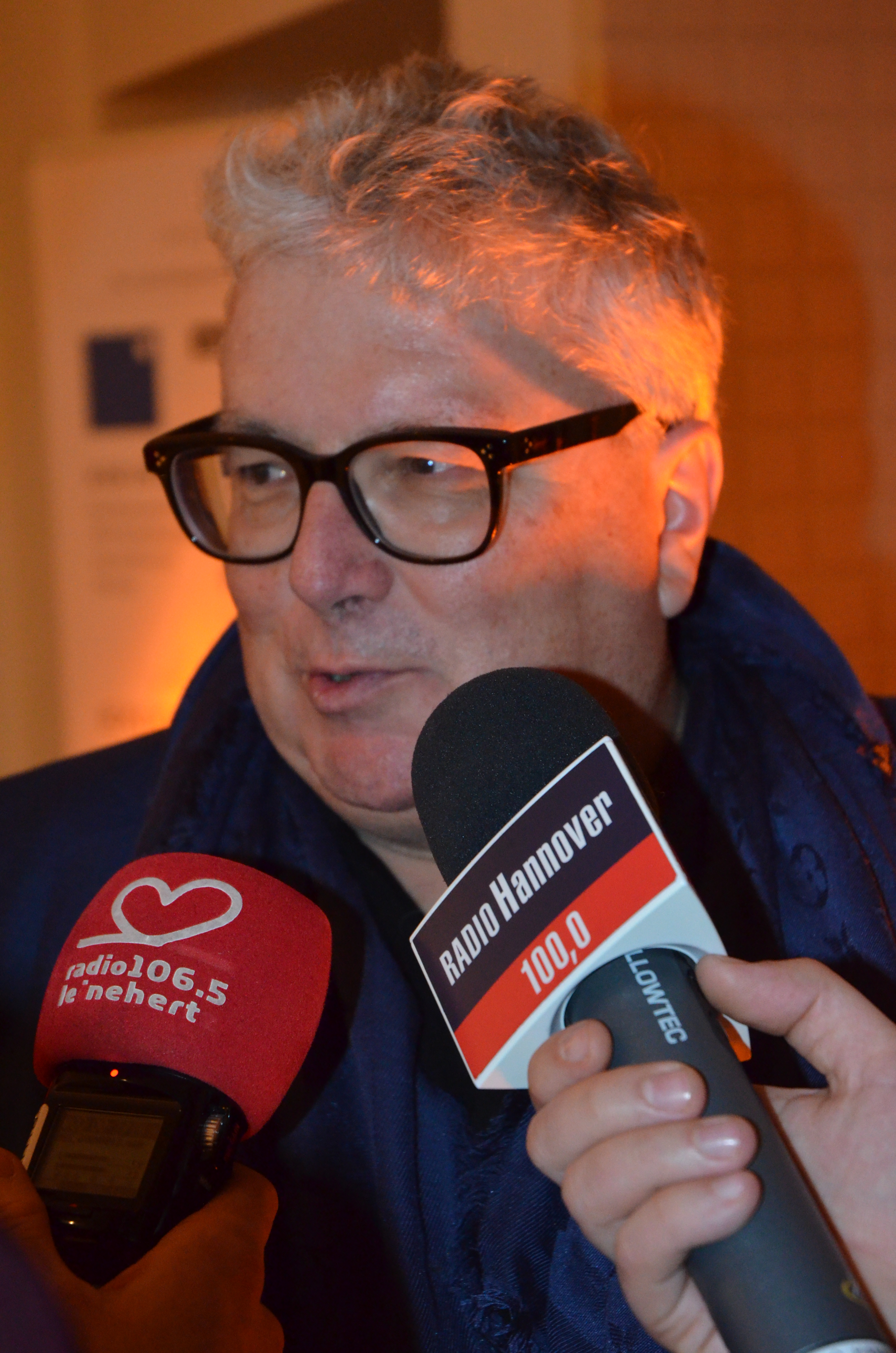
Hans Georg Näder

Hans Georg Näder (born September 4, 1961, in Duderstadt) is a German entrepreneur and Managing Partner of Ottobock.

As of March 2024, he is estimated to be worth $2.8 billion.

== Life ==
Hans Georg Näder was born as the only son of family entrepreneurs Maria and Max Näder. He studied Business Administration in Nuremberg.

== Ottobock ==
In 1990, Näder took over the management of the Ottobock Group from his father. As the third generation, he successfully drove the internationalization of the family business and made Otto Bock the world market leader in prosthetics. The Otto Bock Group now operates in 60 countries and employs around 9,000 people.

Between 2012 and 2018, Näder withdrew increasingly large sums from Ottobock, exceeding the company's profits, causing the equity ratio to drop from 50% in 2011 to 16% in 2021.

In 2017, Näder sold a 20% stake to the Swedish private equity firm EQT. After EQT initiated the sale of the stake in June 2023, Näder bought back the shares in March 2024. For the buyback, he borrowed 1.1 billion euros from credit funds and sold the subsidiary company Sycor at short notice.

In 2019, Näder had to sell the US prosthetics manufacturer Freedom Innovations, which Ottobock had acquired in 2017, after an antitrust lawsuit by the Federal Trade Commission.

In 2022, Näder dismissed almost the entire management board of Ottobock within three days, including Philipp Schulte-Noelle, Kathrin Dahnke and Andreas Goppelt. That same year, Ottobock cancelled the planned IPO with EQT ultimately exiting the company's ownership in 2024, selling the shares back to the Nader family.

In 2024, Ottobock was revealed to have continued as well as starting new trade relationships with Russia despite the 2022 Russian invasion of Ukraine.

== Other activities ==
On January 31, 2005, he was appointed honorary professor at the Private University of Applied Sciences Göttingen (PFH). Since October 2009, he has been a visiting professor at Capital Medical University in Beijing. At the PFH in Göttingen, he was the driving force behind the establishment of the new Orthobionics degree program. He is also the initiator and chairman of the board of trustees of the Südniedersachsen Foundation. In 2022, he was appointed honorary professor at HAWK University in Göttingen.

== Personal life ==
Hans Georg Näder is the father of two daughters, Julia, who works in the family's foundation, and Georgina Maria, who sits on the Ottobock supervisory board.

In 2015, he told Berliner Morgenpost that "marriage no longer works for him" and that he was in a relationship with a Cuban singer. The unnamed woman was a singer whose music was released through Näder's music label HGN Productions & Verlag.

In June 2017, after a months-long relationship, Näder proposed to German model Nathalie Scheil and bought a quarter-page advertisement in Berlin's Tagesspiegel announcing the engagement. The couple separated shortly before their wedding, which was scheduled to take place on Ibiza in May 2018, after Scheil was allegedly caught being unfaithful to Näder in his Berlin home. Despite canceling the wedding, Näder proceeded with the three-day Ibiza celebration in May 2018, attended by hundreds of guests but without the bride.
