= Álvaro Ríos Poveda =

Colombian biomedical engineer

- Born: February 3, 1974 (age 52); Cali, Colombia
- Other name: Alvaro Rios Poveda
- Occupations: Engineer, professor, researcher

Academic background
- Education: Master in Biomedical Engineering from Simon Bolivar University
- Alma mater: Doctorate in Biomedical Engineering from USF

Álvaro Ríos Poveda (born 3 February 1974, Cali, Colombia) is a Colombian electronic engineer, university professor, and researcher who specializes in biomedical engineering and mechatronics. He has performed research on myoelectric prostheses, sensory feedback, and bionic vision technologies.

== Early life and education ==
He began his studies at San Juan Berchmans school in Cali, Colombia.

Ríos earned an undergraduate degree in Electronic Engineering at Pontifical Xavierian University and completed his master's at Simon Bolivar University and doctorate studies at USF in Biomedical Engineering. Along with that, he obtained an MBA from ISEAD. His professional career began with research in neural prostheses and bionics systems. Ríos researched biomedical engineering, artificial intelligence, and robotics in control systems.

== Career ==
Ríos is a researcher and university professor in undergraduate and postgraduate studies in Europe and Mexico. From a young age, his interest had grown into motor limitations.

In 1996, he developed prosthetic systems that allow patients to have greater limb functionality while ensuring accessibility for these systems in developing countries.

In 1997, a sensory feedback system for prostheses was presented at France's World Congress on Biomedical Engineering. Ríos's public work includes myoelectric prosthesis with sensory feedback, presented at MEC'02: The Next Generation. His work mainly aims of his work is to control prosthetics more naturally, utilizing artificial intelligence, neural control, machine learning, and gesture control.

== Research ==
He has remained a member of the Publications Committee of the International Federation of Medical and Biological Engineering and a founding member of the Colombian Association of Biomedical Engineering. Since its inception in 2017, Ríos has been participating at every CBS IEEE International Conference on Bionic Systems and Cyborg and giving guest participation at IEEE's CBS 2017. Later in 2018, he represented the Latin American region at a conference on Upper Limb Prosthesis. Since then, Ríos has remained Chairman for the region of the Americas at the 2020 IEEE CBS and has also been working with World Health Organization, a member of Global Cooperation on Assistive Technology. He also established HAT (Human Assistive Technologies), a bionics company based in Mexico City. At HAT, a C-Hand was developed, which is a bionic prosthesis with sensory feedback and gesture control, and is a bionic arm designed for smart cities.

== Recognition ==
- Gold Cross Degree at (Council of Cali 2022)
- Bristol Honor 2014 (Who's who honor)

== Publications ==
- Rios Poveda, A. (2002). Myoelectric prostheses with sensorial feedback. Myoelectric Symposium.
- Peregrina, Miguel Amezcua; Poveda, Alvaro Rios (2018). "Design and development of an open antropomorphic robotic hand development system". 2018 IEEE International Conference on Cyborg and Bionic Systems (CBS). IEEE. pp. 592–596. doi:10.1109/cbs.2018.8612147. ISBN 978-1-5386-7355-3.3. Poveda, AER (2001). Microcontrolled system for the development of myoelectric prostheses with sensory feedback (Doctoral dissertation, Pontificia Universidad Javeriana. Cali).
- University of New Brunswick. Institute of Biomedical Engineering (2002). MEC '02 : the next generation : University of New Brunswick's Myoelectric Controls/Powered Prosthetics Symposium, Fredericton, N.B., Canada, August 21-23, 2002 : conference proceedings. Fredericton, NB: Nstitute of Biomedical Engineering, University of New Brunswick. ISBN 1-55131-029-5. OCLC 270459759.
- ios, Alvaro (1997). "Microcontroller system for Myoelectric prosthesis with sensorial feedback". World Congress on Medical Physics and Biomedical Engineering: XVIII International Conference on Medical and Biological Engineering and XI International Conference on Medical Physics. ISSN 0140-0118.
- Hernandez Arieta, A.; Yokoi, H.; Arai, T. (2005). "Study on the Effects of Electrical Stimulation on the Pattern Recognition for an EMG Prosthetic Application". 2005 IEEE Engineering in Medicine and Biology 27th Annual Conference. IEEE. pp. 6919–6922. doi:10.1109/iembs.2005.1616097. ISBN 0-7803-8741-4.
- Yokoi, Hiroshi; Arieta, Alejandro Hernandez; Katoh, Ryu; Yu, Wenwei; Watanabe, Ichiro; Maruishi, Masaharu (2004). "Mutual Adaptation in a Prosthetics Application". Embodied Artificial Intelligence. Berlin, Heidelberg: Springer Berlin Heidelberg. doi:10.1007/978-3-540-27833-7_11. ISBN 978-3-540-22484-6. ISSN 0302-9743.
- Kumar, Deonath; Patra, Karali (2015). "Externally powered upper limb prostheses". 2015 International Conference on Futuristic Trends on Computational Analysis and Knowledge Management (ABLAZE). IEEE. pp. 44–48. doi:10.1109/ablaze.2015.7154968. ISBN 978-1-4799-8433-6.
- Peregrina, Miguel Amezcua; Poveda, Alvaro Rios (2018). "Design and development of an open antropomorphic robotic hand development system". 2018 IEEE International Conference on Cyborg and Bionic Systems (CBS). IEEE. pp. 592–596. doi:10.1109/cbs.2018.8612147. ISBN 978-1-5386-7355-3.
- HERNANDEZ A., Alejandro; YOKOI, Hiroshi; ARAI, Tamio (2006). "2P2-B22 Sensation Generation using Electrical Stimulation for a Prosthetic System". The Proceedings of JSME Annual Conference on Robotics and Mechatronics (Robomec). 2006. Japan Society of Mechanical Engineers: _2P2–B22_1–_2P2–B22_4. doi:10.1299/jsmermd.2006._2p2-b22_1. ISSN 2424-3124.
- Hernandez Arieta, A.; Dermitzakis, C.; Damian, D.; Lungarella, M.; Pfeifer, R. (2008). "Sensory-motor coupling in rehabilitation robotics". IN-Tech Education and Publishing: 21–36. doi:10.5167/UZH-17953.
- Yokoi, Hiroshi; Arieta, Alejandro Hernandez; Katoh, Ryu; Yu, Wenwei; Watanabe, Ichiro; Maruishi, Masaharu (2004). "Mutual Adaptation in a Prosthetics Application". Embodied Artificial Intelligence. Berlin, Heidelberg: Springer Berlin Heidelberg. doi:10.1007/978-3-540-27833-7_11. ISBN 978-3-540-22484-6. ISSN 0302-9743.
- Arieta, Alejandro Hernandez; Kato, Ryu; Yokoi, Hiroshi; Arai, Tamio (2006). "A fMRI study of the Cross-Modal Interaction in the Brain with an Adaptable EMG Prosthetic Hand with Biofeedback". 2006 International Conference of the IEEE Engineering in Medicine and Biology Society. IEEE. pp. 1280–1284. doi:10.1109/iembs.2006.259938. ISBN 1-4244-0032-5.
