= Open Bionics =

UK prostethic limb manufacturer

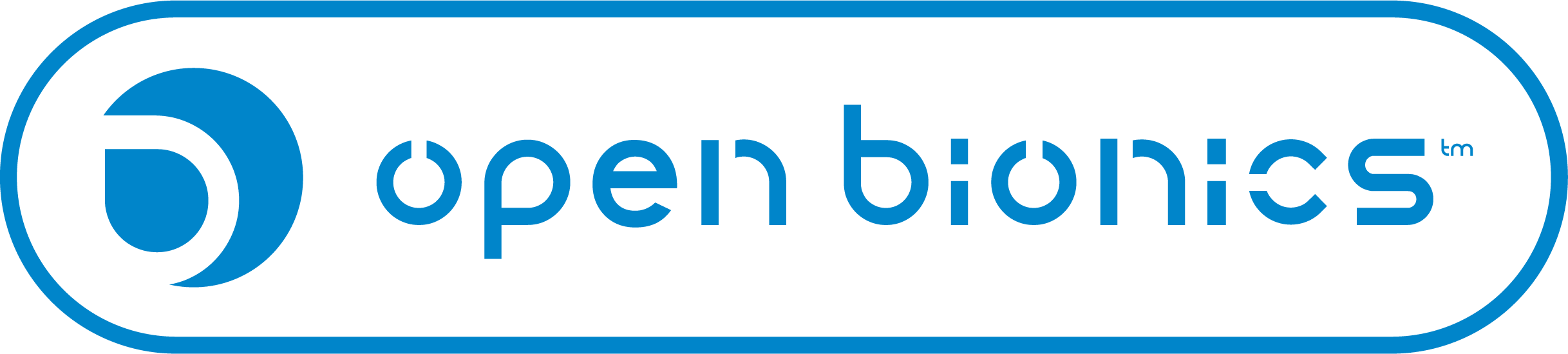
- Type: Private company
- Industry: Medical devices, healthcare
- Headquarters: Bristol, United Kingdom
- Key people: Joel Gibbard MBE CEO; Samantha Payne MBE COO
- Products: 3D printed bionic prosthetics
- Website: www.openbionics.com

Open Bionics is a UK-based company that develops low-cost, 3D printed bionic arms for amputees with below elbow amputations (more formally known as myoelectric prostheses). Their bionic arms are fully functional with lights, bio feedback vibrations, and different functions that allow the user to grab, pinch, high-five, fist bump, and thumbs-up. The company is based inside Future Space, co-located with Bristol Robotics Laboratory. The company was founded in 2014 by Joel Gibbard MBE and Samantha Payne MBE.

In 2020 Joel Gibbard and Samantha Payne were awarded MBEs for their services to Innovation, Engineering, and Technology.

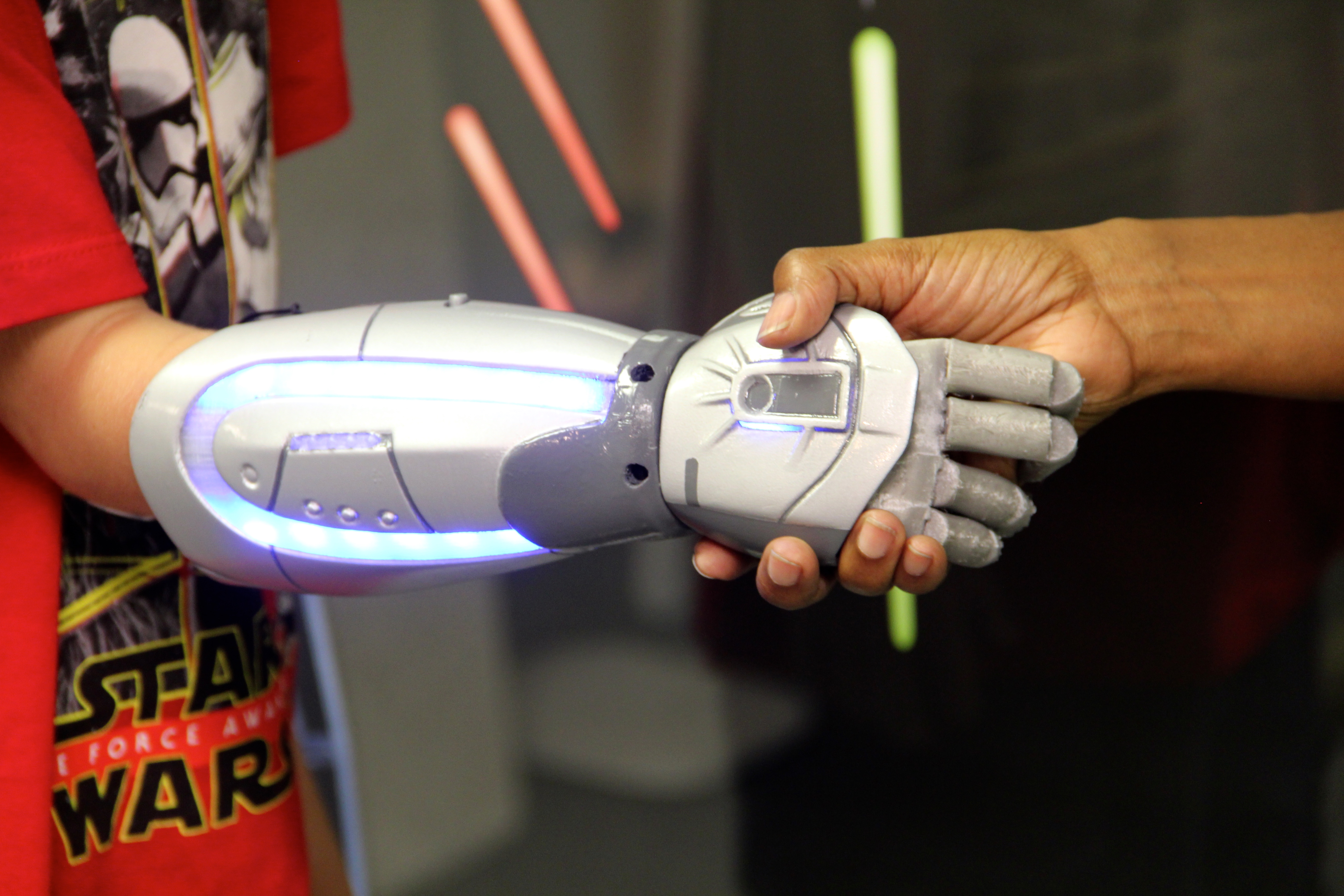
A 3D printed Star Wars bionic hand by Open Bionics in collaboration with ILM XLab.

== History ==
Open Bionics grew out of the Open Hand project created by Joel Gibbard after studying robotics at the University of Plymouth. The project aimed to use 3D printing to create hand prostheses. Samantha Payne had interviewed him as a reporter in Bristol covering social impact stories. At the time, Samantha was also supporting girls and women who had experienced domestic violence and abuse to develop and prototype safeguarding pieces of wearable technology. They bonded over social impact, 3D printing, and prototyping and founded Open Bionics together in 2014.

In 2018 they were named the Hottest Startup Founders in Europe at the Europa Awards.

In late 2023, Open Bionics expanded its clinical presence in the United States, with clinics located in Denver, Los Angeles, Orlando, Austin, Chicago, Charlotte, Atlanta, Pittsburgh, Detroit, and New York City.

== Products ==
The first product, the Hero Arm, was differentiated not only by its relatively low price given the functionality but also by making a bold positive feature of the artificial arm, rather than disguising it to look like a natural body part. Each arm is 3D printed to the user's specific measurements and muscle sensors control servo-actuated movement of the fingers. Key features include 6 different grip types, 180-degree wrist rotation, magnetically attached swappable decorative covers, adjustable fit to compensate for limb expansion (e.g. with temperature), and a ventilated liner. Users have access to a Sidekick App developed by Calvium with interactive training guides and personalization controls.

In 2025, Open Bionics launched new models of the Hero Arm, the Hero Pro & Hero RGD. These hands are wireless and waterproof, and work when detached from the wearer.

== Partnerships ==
In 2015, Disney and Open Bionics announced a partnership to create superhero-themed prosthetics for young amputees. In the same year, the company won the 2015 James Dyson Award in the UK for innovative engineering and Tech4Good's 2015 Accessibility Award. In 2016, it won a Bloomberg Business Innovators award.

In January 2019, James Cameron and 20th Century Fox partnered with Open Bionics to give 13-year-old double amputee Tilly Lockey a pair of Alita-inspired bionic Hero Arms for the London premiere of Alita: Battle Angel. Lockey lost both of her hands when she developed meningococcal sepsis at 15 months of age.

In 2020, Open Bionics partnered with gaming company Konami to create 'Venom Snake' Hero Arm covers, which are featured in the 2015 video game Metal Gear Solid V: The Phantom Pain.

In 2023, Open Bionics collaborated with Ukraine charity Superhumans Center to fit Ukrainian soldiers with bionic Hero Arms as a result of the ongoing Russian invasion of Ukraine

In 2026, Open Bionics collaborated with Mr Beast to surprise a young American boy named Kai with a custom Mr Beast bionic arm.

== Funding ==
In January 2019, Open Bionics raised Series A funding of $5.9 million. The round was led by Foresight Williams Technology EIS Fund, Ananda Impact Ventures and Downing Ventures, with participation from F1's Williams Advanced Engineering Group among others.
