= Micromechanical Flying Insect =

Miniature flying object

The Micromechanical Flying Insect (MFI) is a miniature UAV (unmanned aerial vehicle) composed of a metal body, two wings, and a control system. Launched in 1998, it is currently being researched at University of California, Berkeley. The MFI is among a group of UAVs that vary in size and function. The MFI is proving to be a practical approach for specific situations. The US Office of Naval Research and Defense Advanced Research Project Agency are funding the project. The Pentagon hopes to use the robots as covert "flies on the wall" in military operations. Other prospective uses include space exploration and search and rescue.

== Comparison with other UAVs ==
There are a variety of UAVs that perform different operations. The MFI may be of potential use to the United States Military. There are currently various UAVs in this field that perform tasks such as gaining battlefield intelligence or being a decoy for potential missiles. In respect to gaining battlefield intelligence there are many drones in use by the military to execute different missions. The US Military is constantly upgrading to stealthier UAVs that can perform more missions while remaining virtually undetected. Essential qualifications for a military grade UAV include:

- Size
- Noise level
- Versatility

These are potential reasons for the MFI to be of interest to the military. It takes the functions of larger UAVs and crunches it down into a smaller less easily detected device. It reduces size and noise level of current UAVs. The actual "crunching" of these capabilities into the MFI raises the problem of creating a supple frame and a pair of wings with an autonomous computer to control them.

== Technical aspects ==
=== Structure and materials ===
The initial prototypes of the MFI weighed 100 milligrams and had wingspans of 2 centimeters. They were structured with stainless steel beams and polymer flexures as joints. This created a weight-to-lift ratio that led to an issue with achieving flight. The beams and joints were then changed to lighter materials that perform better. The beams were converted from stainless steel to honey-comb carbon fiber beams, while the joints were changed to silicon, mimicking typical micromechanical structures. These raw materials used cost around 10 cents to construct.

=== Functions and mobility ===
The overall functionality of the MFI is broken up into smaller components that cohesively work with one another to sustain a stable and particular flight pattern. These components are:

- Power supply – a battery pack rechargeable through solar panels on the exterior body
- Sensory system – a group consisting of two eyes and multiple temperature, wind, and speed sensors
- Locomotive and control – the wings connected to respective actuators
- Communication – the internal network of algorithms and sensory signals

These units work together to take a specific task, such as "fly forward", as an input and signals are sent through to both wings to produce a calibrated output to perform the task. This is a more in depth view of the flow of operations; the initial visual system analyzes the location in three-dimensional space, through computing the displacement between objects and itself. The fly is then chosen to execute a task, i.e. "find an object" or "explore". Unlike other UAVs, the MFI has to have an autonomous computer system because it is too small to be controlled by a remote, so it must be able to sustain itself. Once the action has been chosen the signal moves on to the inertial system to then distribute the specific functions, in respect to the action, to the wings. The wings then use a number of sensors to deliver the most accurate wing thrusts to fulfill the action.

=== Problems and complications ===
There are problems pertaining to this system that have arisen during the development of the MFI, and this has demanded further research. The first problem is the initial input of visual data that is to be computed. There is a substantial degree of noise in the data obtained through the "eyes", when this is passed through the system to the wings it produces an inaccurate output therefore not achieving the initial action correctly.

Another problem is the "hovering" method of the MFI. Essentially the MFI has to be in equilibrium in three-dimensional space while producing a wing thrust that will sustain the desired altitude. The issue with this concept is the inadequate research on the flight patterns of flies, furthermore creating an algorithm to perform such patterns.

== Timeline of development ==
- 1998 – Research began at University of California, Berkeley through a $2.5 million contract.
- 2001 – The prototype (with a single wing) showed thrust forces on a test stand.
- 2002 – Fabrication was switched from folded stainless steel to carbon fiber.
- 2003 – 500 micronewtons of lift from a single wing was demonstrated on a test stand.
- 2007 – High lift force with 275 Hz wing beat in MFI. Steltz et al IROS 2007.
- 2007 – Dynamometer power output measurements of piezoelectric actuators. Steltz & Fearing, IROS 2007.
- 2007 to current – Work concentrated on reducing weight, increasing actuator power density, increasing air frame strength, and improving wing control.
