= Greg Parker =

British physicist

Greg Parker (born 1954) is a British physicist. He served as a Professor of Photonics at the University of Southampton. He spent 23 years in research and lecturing.

== Career ==
He now runs Parker Technology. His research interests included the design and construction of Ultra High Vacuum (UHV) compatible semiconductor deposition systems, and the design and fabrication of Photonic Crystal circuits and devices. Most recently, he became interested in deep-sky imaging, macrophotography, microphotography, pin-hole camera photography and high-speed flash photography. He is the designer and developer of ultra-high speed Xenon flash equipment. His photographic work is featured on the New Forest Observatory web site.

He has 13 patents on optical devices and circuits and created three successful companies. His most recent spin-out from Southampton University was Mesophotonics Ltd.

He is constructing the world's most powerful amateur deep-sky imaging system, the mini-WASP imaging array, named after the SuperWASP array built for the Wide Angle Search for Planets.

== Publications ==
Parker published over 120 refereed journal and conference papers, a textbook on Solid-State Physics, Introductory Semiconductor Device Physics, a "how to" book on astrophotography Making Beautiful Deep-Sky Images and a large format book of deep-sky images taken from the New Forest Observatory, called Star Vistas.

== Recognition ==
Parker was a Chartered Engineer, a Chartered Physicist, and a Fellow of the Institute of Physics.
