= Jack E. Steele =

American doctor & colonel (1924–2009)

Jack E. Steele (January 27, 1924 – January 19, 2009) was an American medical doctor and retired US Air Force colonel, most widely known for coining the word bionics.

== Biography ==
Steele was born Jack Ellwood Steele in Lacon, Illinois. He attended Mendota Township High School (Mendota, Ill), then went on to study general engineering at the University of Illinois and the Illinois Institute of Technology. He served in the US Army from 1943 to 1946, who put him through pre-med at University of Minnesota in 1944. He received his M.D. from Northwestern University in 1950. He spent a year there as Research and Teaching Fellow in Neuro-anatomy before joining the US Air Force in 1951 where he served until retirement in 1971. He initially served as Ward Officer of Psychiatry and Neurology until he joined 6570th Aerospace Medical Research Lab in 1953. There he investigated stress effects of motions, sound and wind blast, but his main focus was on bionics, a term he coined in 1958. The term was officially used in 1960 as the title of a three-day symposium in September of that year.

His work on bionics, and the USAF research on cyborgs, caught the attention of SF writer and aviation expert Martin Caidin, whose 1972 book Cyborg makes explicit reference to then-Major Jack Steele. The book formed the basis of the TV series The Six Million Dollar Man (and spinoff The Bionic Woman), which popularized, if somewhat inaccurately, the term bionics. (Steele's original meaning was the study of biological organisms to find solutions to engineering problems, a field now also known as biomimetics.)

After retiring from the Air Force, Steele continued to practice medicine with a focus on psychiatry, and served as Medical Director of the Comprehensive Drug Dependency Treatment Program at the Dayton Mental Health Center, where he worked for 20 years until retirement. Steele died in Dayton, Ohio on 19 January 2009 after a protracted illness.
