= Superhumans Center =

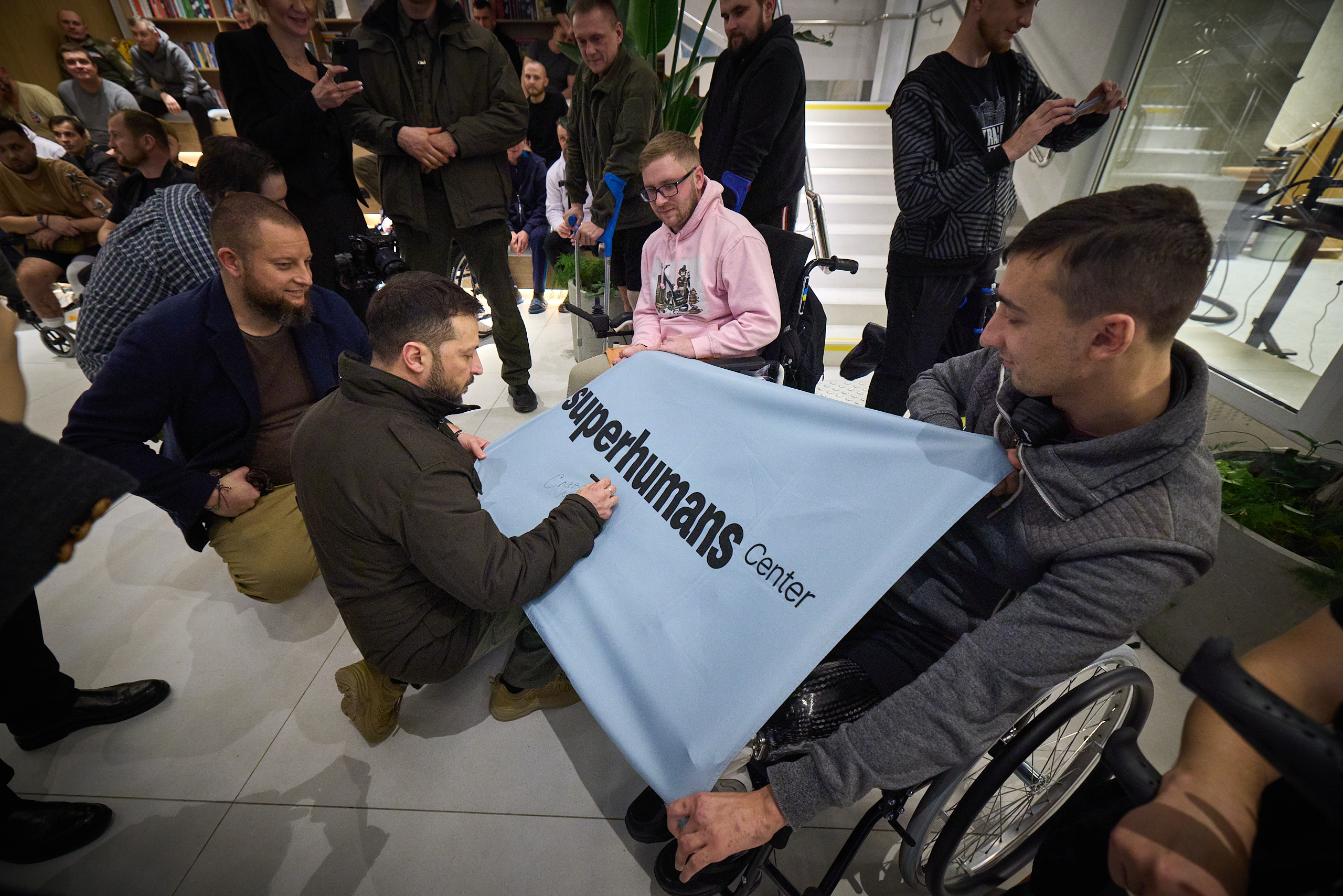

Geography
- Location: Wynnyky, Lviv Oblast, Ukraine

Services
- Beds: 50

Links
- Website: https://www.superhumans.com/
- Lists: Hospitals in Ukraine

The Superhumans Center is a specialist clinic for the treatment and rehabilitation of war victims with specialist in orthopaedic trauma, reconstructive and plastic surgery, facial surgery and ear, nose and throat surgery as well as rehabilitation specialists and prostheticians. It is based in Lviv Oblast, Ukraine.

== History ==
Superhumans Center was founded in 2022 in Vynnyky, Lviv region, on the basis of an existing state medical institution, as Ukraine’s need for prosthetics, reconstructive surgery and rehabilitation expanded after Russia’s full-scale invasion. The project was initiated by Ukrainian businessman Andriy Stavnitser, with Filip Hrushko as another founder and Olha Rudneva appointed as CEO; Ukraine’s Ministry of Health described the planned facility as a specialised clinic for prosthetics, reconstruction and rehabilitation for adults and children injured by the war. Howard Graham Buffett provided the initial funding of $16.3 million.

The first unit began operating in April 2023 after reconstruction of the premises, with rehabilitation, prosthetics and a prosthesis manufacturing laboratory located at the centre. The hospital was ceremoniously opened after 8 months of renovation in the presence of the First Lady of Ukraine Olena Zelenska (who sits on the center's board) and the Minister of Health Viktor Liashko. Among the guests of honor at the opening was Richard Branson of the Virgin Group

Since opening, Superhumans has expanded its activities in response to the growing number of Ukrainian amputees and other war-wounded patients, including by opening a new hospital wing in Lviv and planning additional facilities elsewhere in Ukraine.

By mid-2023, an estimated 10,000 Ukrainians had lost a limb during the war. As of 2024, the center continues to repair Ukraine's most gravely war-wounded.

== Services ==
Many patients are dependent on a prosthesis due to amputation. The focus of the clinic is a personalized approach to body and facial reconstruction, limb reconstruction and prothesis, free tissue transfer and complex plastic surgical reconstruction of muscles nerves and soft tissue, exoskeletons, powered by domestically manufactured state-of-the-art medical devices but also psychological support for patient. The center operates several departments, including surgical, traumatological, physical, PTSD and a pediatric reconstruction department.

The array of advanced prostheses offered at the Superhumans Center includes bionic Zeus hands from Aether Biomedical (Poland), Hero Arms from Open Bionics (UK), with training provided by Ottobock (Germany).

== Notable support ==
Supporters include rock singer Sting and his partner Trudie Styler, actor and director Liev Schreiber, the British Virgin Group, and various American charities operating under the U.S. Charities covered by 501(c)(3).

On November 5, 2022, Ukrainian singer-actor Andriy Danylko, also known by his stage name Verka Serduchka, auctioned off his 1974 Rolls-Royce, once owned by Freddie Mercury, through London auction house Sotheby's for £250,000 to deal with the sale of the car to the Superhumans Center for support. The car, which was auctioned by Danylko in 2013 for £75,000, raised an additional £36,250 thanks to the sale house waiving the buyer's premium, raising a total of £286,250 (about €328,900). In 2023-2024, Dmytro Derevytskyy's company, ALLO donated UAH 15 million for prostheses and prosthetics.

On April 10, 2025, during his first visit to Ukraine, Prince Harry visited the Superhumans Center. A meeting with the team of the Come Back Alive Foundation and the Come Back Alive Initiative Center, led by Deputy Director Oleh Karpenko, took place at the facility. Representatives of the Invictus Games Foundation, the Ukrainian Invictus Games team, as well as representatives of ministries and veteran initiatives were also in attendance.

== See also ==
- UNBROKEN Center
