= Esper Bionics =

Ukrainian-American medtech company

Esper Inc
- Type: Public
- Industry: HealthTech, Wearable devices
- Founded: 2019
- Founder: Dmytro Gazda, Anna Believantseva, Ihor Ilchenko, Borys Lobanov
- Headquarters: New York, U.S.A.
- Number of employees: 80+
- Website: https://www.esperbionics.com/

Esper (also referred to as Esper Bionics) is a Ukrainian-American medical technology company that develops myoelectric upper-limb prostheses. The company was founded in Kyiv in 2019 and later established its headquarters in New York City, while retaining research, development, and production operations in Ukraine. The company's principal product is the Esper Hand, a robotic prosthetic hand controlled through electrical signals generated by the user's remaining muscles. The device was included in Time magazine's list of the Best Inventions of 2022.

== History ==
Esper was founded in Kyiv in 2019 by Dmytro Gazda, Anna Believantseva, Ihor Ilchenko, and Borys Lobanov. The company supplied its prototype to a user in 2020 and moved its headquarters to New York in May 2022. Most of its research and development remained in Kyiv.

In June 2024, Esper Bionics raised $5 million in a funding round led by the health-technology investment firm YZR Capital, with participation from the European Bank for Reconstruction and Development and u.ventures. The company said that the financing would be used to expand production and research and development.

== Products ==
=== Esper Hand ===
The Esper Hand is a myoelectric prosthesis. Sensors fitted within the prosthetic socket detect electrical activity produced by contractions of the user's residual muscles and transmit commands to motors that move the hand and fingers.

The hand's settings can be adjusted through a Bluetooth-connected mobile application. Esper has described the system as using data and machine-learning software to adapt its controls to individual users over time.

In 2025, the company introduced Esper Hand 2, an updated version of the prosthesis with changes to its components, grip strength and water resistance.

== Operations in Ukraine ==
Following the Russian invasion of Ukraine in 2022, Esper increased the share of its production distributed in Ukraine. The company began supplying prostheses through the donor-supported Esper for Ukraine program, which serves military personnel and civilians with upper-limb loss.

The Associated Press reported in December 2023 that Esper's Kyiv facility was producing approximately twelve hands per month and that the company was distributing most of its output in Ukraine at that time. In July 2024, The Kyiv Independent reported that Esper had produced more than 200 hands, with more than 100 supplied to Ukrainians injured during the war.

In May 2024, the company received a $150,000 grant through the United States Agency for International Development's Competitive Economy of Ukraine program. The grant was intended to support production in Kyiv, including equipment, software, and additional staff.

== Reported limitations ==
The Kyiv Independent documented durability problems encountered during intensive use.

Ukrainian serviceman Borys Bass said that parts of his Esper Hand broke during military training. The company said that feedback from military and veteran users contributed to subsequent changes to the device's construction, including the introduction of metal fingers.

== Market position ==
The Esper Hand is sold primarily in the United States, where it is priced at approximately $22,000 and is typically covered by health insurance. In Ukraine, the Associated Press reported that rehabilitation providers source bionic prostheses from German and Icelandic manufacturers as well as from Esper, and that the company's domestic manufacturing and service capacity allows repairs and refittings to be carried out without travel abroad.

== See also ==
- Ottobock
- Prosthesis
- Wearable technology
- Electromyography
