= Otto Schmitt =

American inventor and scientist (1913–1998)

- Born: 6 April 1913; St. Louis, Missouri, USA
- Died: 6 January 1998 (aged 84); Minneapolis, Minnesota, USA
- Citizenship: United States (1913–1998)
- Spouse: Viola Schmitt
- Awards: John Price Wetherill Medal (1972)
- Scientific career
- Fields: Biophysics; Bioengineering; Electrical engineering
- Institutions: Washington University; University of Minnesota; University College, London
- Thesis: An electrical theory of nerve impulse propagation (1937)

Otto Herbert Schmitt (April 6, 1913 – January 6, 1998) was an American inventor, engineer, and biophysicist known for his scientific contributions to biophysics and for establishing the field of biomedical engineering. Schmitt also coined the term biomimetics and invented or co-invented the Schmitt trigger, the differential amplifier, and the chopper-stabilized amplifier.

He was elected in 1953 a Fellow of the American Physical Society. He was awarded the John Price Wetherill Medal in 1972.
