= Janine Benyus =

American writer

Janine M. Benyus
- Born: 1958 (age 67–68); New Jersey
- Education: Rutgers University
- Known for: Biomimicry

External videos
- "The Promise of Biomimicry", Janine Benyus, January 23, 2020
- Biomimicry, Tree Media, September 11, 2015
- Janine Benyus, Innovator in the Field of Biomimicry - Heinz Award, November 19, 2021
- Biomimicry as a Cooperative Inquiry - Bioneers, Janine Benyus with introduction by Paul Hawken, 2016

Janine M. Benyus (born 1958) is an American natural sciences writer, innovation consultant, and author. After writing books on wildlife and animal behavior, she coined the term Biomimicry to describe intentional problem-solving design inspired by nature. Her book Biomimicry (1997) attracted widespread attention from businesspeople in design, architecture, and engineering as well as from scientists. Benyus argues that by following biomimetic approaches, designers can develop products that will perform better, be less expansive, use less energy, and leave companies less open to legal risk.

== Life ==
Born in New Jersey, Benyus graduated summa cum laude from Rutgers University with degrees in natural resource management and English literature/writing. Benyus has taught interpretive writing and lectured at the University of Montana, and worked towards restoring and protecting wild lands. She serves on a number of land use committees in her rural county, and is president of Living Education, a nonprofit dedicated to place-based living and learning. Benyus lives in Stevensville, Montana.

== Biomimicry ==
Benyus is sometimes referred to as the "Godmother of Biomimicry" and has written a number of books on animals and their behavior. She is best known for Biomimicry: Innovation Inspired by Nature (1997). In this book she develops the basic thesis that human beings should consciously emulate nature's genius in their designs. She encourages people to ask "What would Nature do?" and to look at natural forms, processes, and ecosystems in nature to see what works and what lasts.

If you go into the world with an attitude of deep and reverent observation, you don't go with a pre-formed hypothesis. I am much more excited by staying open so that I can absorb something I could never have imagined.... That deep observation is a different kind of scientific inquiry. It may allow me to find something new while someone who is prejudging, someone with a hypothesis, will only see what affirms the hypothesis. If you go out waiting to be amazed, more may be revealed.

Benyus articulates an approach that strongly emphasizes sustainability within biomimicry practice. sometimes referred to as Conditions Conducive to Life (CCL). Benyus has described the development of sustainable solutions in terms of "Life’s Principles", emphasizing that organisms in nature have evolved methods of working that are not destructive of themselves and their environment. “Nature runs on sunlight, uses only the energy it needs, fits form to function, recycles everything, rewards cooperation, banks on diversity, demands local expertise, curbs excess from within and taps the power of limits”.

In 1998, Benyus and Dayna Baumeister co-founded the Biomimicry Guild as an innovation consultancy. Their goal was to help innovators learn from and emulate natural models in order to design sustainable products, processes, and policies that create conditions conducive to life.

In 2006, Benyus co-founded The Biomimicry Institute with Dayna Baumeister and Bryony Schwan. Benyus is President of the non-profit organization, whose mission is to naturalize biomimicry in the culture by promoting the transfer of ideas, designs, and strategies from biology to sustainable human systems design. In 2008 the Biomimicry Institute launched AskNature.org, "an encyclopedia of nature's solutions to common design problems". The Biomimicry Institute has become a key communicator in the field of biomimetics, connecting 12,576 member practitioners and organizations in 36 regional networks and 21 countries through its Biomimicry Global Network as of 2020.

In 2010, Benyus, Dayna Baumeister, Bryony Schwan, and Chris Allen formed Biomimicry 3.8, connecting their for-profit and nonprofit work by creating a benefit corporation. Biomimicry 3.8, which achieved B-corp certification, offers consultancy, professional training, development for educators, and "inspirational speaking". Among its more than 250 clients are Nike, Kohler. Seventh Generation and C40 Cities. By 2013, over 100 universities had joined the Biomimicry Educator’s Network, offering training in biomimetics. In 2014, the profit and non-profit aspects again became separate entities, with Biomimicry 3.8 engaging in for-profit consultancy and the Biomimicry Institute as a non-profit organization.

Benyus has served on various boards, including the Board of Directors for the U.S. Green Building Council and the advisory boards of the Ray C. Anderson Foundation and Project Drawdown. Benyus is an affiliate faculty member in The Biomimicry Center at Arizona State University.

Beynus' work has been used as the basis for films including the two-part film Biomimicry: Learning from Nature (2002), directed by Paul Lang and David Springbett for CBC's The Nature of Things and presented by David Suzuki. She was one of the experts in the film Dirt! The Movie (2009) which was voiced by Jamie Lee Curtis.

== Authored works ==
- Benyus, Janine M. (1998). The secret language and remarkable behavior of animals. New York: Black Dog & Leventhal Publishers. ISBN 1-57912-036-9. Illustrated by Juan Carlos Barberis.
- Benyus, Janine M. (1997). Biomimicry : innovation inspired by nature (1st ed.). New York: Morrow. ISBN 0-06-053322-6.
- Benyus, Janine M. (1992). Beastly behaviors : a zoo lovers companion. Reading, Massachusetts: Addison-Wesley. ISBN 0-201-62482-6. Illustrated by Juan Carlos Barberis.
- Benyus, Janine M.; Buech, Richard R.; Nelson, Mark D. (1992). Wildlife in the Upper Great Lakes Region: a community profile. Research Paper NC-301. St. Paul, MN: U.S. Dept. of Agriculture, Forest Service, North Central Forest Experiment Station. doi:10.2737/NC-RP-301. hdl:2027/umn.31951d029779112.
- Benyus, Janine M. (1989). Northwoods wildlife : a watcher's guide to habitats. Minocqua, WI: NorthWord Press. ISBN 1-55971-003-9.
- Benyus, Janine M. (1989). The field guide to wildlife habitats of the eastern United States. New York: Simon & Schuster. ISBN 0-671-65908-1.
- Benyus, Janine M. (1989). The field guide to wildlife habitats of the western United States. New York: Simon & Schuster. ISBN 067165909X.
- Benyus, Janine M. (1983). Christmas tree pest manual. St. Paul, Minn.: U.S. Dept. of Agriculture, Forest Service, North Central Forest Experiment Station.

== Awards and honors ==
- 2020, Trailblazer Award at Verdical Group's Net Zero Conference
- 2019, Fellow, American Society of Interior Designers (ASID)
- 2015, Edward O. Wilson Biodiversity Technology Pioneer Award
- 2013, Gothenburg Award for Sustainable Development
- 2012, Design Mind Award. Smithsonian’s Cooper-Hewitt National Design Museum
- 2011, Heinz Award. with special focus on the environment
- 2009, Champion of the Earth for Science and Technology, United Nations Environment Programme.
- 2007, Hero of the Environment, Time International
- 2006, Women of Discovery Award, WINGS WorldQuest
- 2004, Rachel Carson Lecture on Environmental Ethics
- 2003, Lud Browman Award for Science Writing, Friends of the Mansfield Library, University of Montana

== See also ==
- Biomimicry
