= Ottobock =

German prosthetics company

Ottobock SE & Co. KGaA
- Type: SE & Co. KGaA
- Industry: Orthopaedic
- Founded: January 13, 1919; 107 years ago in Berlin, Germany
- Founder: Otto Bock
- Headquarters: Duderstadt, Germany
- Area served: In 45 countries
- Key people: Hans Georg Näder (Chairman of the Board of Directors); Bernd Bohr (Chairman Supervisory Board); Oliver Jakobi (CEO/CSO); Arne Kreitz (CFO); Arne Jörn (COO/CTO); Martin Böhm (CXO)
- Products: wheelchair, prosthetic, artificial limbs
- Revenue: ▲€1.6 billion (2024)
- Owner: Näder Holding (100%)
- Number of employees: 9100 (2024)
- Website: ottobock.com

Ottobock SE & Co. KGaA, formerly Otto Bock, is an international company based in Duderstadt Germany, that operates in the field of orthopedic technology. It is considered the world market leader in the field of prosthetics and one of the leading suppliers in orthotics, wheelchairs and exoskeletons.

Näder Holding GmbH & Co. KG is entirely owned by the Näder family, direct descendants of the company's founder, Otto Bock. Näder Holding controls 80% of the shares in Ottobock SE & Co. KGaA. The remaining 20% of the shares were previously held by the Swedish financial investor EQT. However, in March 2024, it was announced that Näder Holding had repurchased these shares from EQT for EUR 1.1 billion.

In 2024, the Ottobock Group as a whole generated sales of €1,6 billion and had 9,100 employees in 45 countries.

In August 2025, several international newspapers reported on an upcoming initial public offering in fall 2025 which got confirmed to happen in October by Ottobock. The targeted market value is EUR 4.2 billion. Several media shared critical perspectives due to the high borrowings, extensive business with Russia and the National Socialist past.

== History ==
=== Foundation of the company from 1919 ===
The company was founded on January 13, 1919 under the appellation Orthopädische Industrie GmbH, headquartered in Berlin. Initiated by a group surrounding a manufacturer named Otto Bock, who hailed from Krefeld, its objective was to supply prostheses and orthopedic products to the many thousands of war invalids of World War I. Bock acted as production manager during this phase.

In 1920, production operations were relocated to Königsee in Thuringia, where at times, a workforce of up to 600 people was employed. Faced with high demand that could not be met with traditional handicraft or artisanal methods, Otto Bock began the mass-production of prosthetic components, thus laying the foundation for the orthopedic industry. Bock moved into the management of the company in 1924 and finally took over as sole managing director in 1927. With the evolution of the industry, new materials began to be used in production, notably aluminum, which found early application in prosthetic construction during the 1930s.

=== National Socialist era 1933-1945 ===
In May 1933, Bock joined the NSDAP. During the 1930s he became a supporting member of the SS. He paid a monthly contribution of six Reichmarks, according to his own account, until 1938. At the end of 1933, Bock had Orthopädische Industrie GmbH liquidated and paid out the remaining shareholders. The company was renamed Orthopedic Industry Otto Bock in Königsee.

Max Näder, after completing his secondary education in 1935, commenced his professional journey by undertaking training as an orthopedic mechanic and industrial clerk at Otto Bock. During his later studies in Berlin, he became part of the National Socialist German Student Association (NSDStB). During the African campaign, Näder was awarded the Iron Cross II Class. In 1943, while on leave, he married Maria Bock, the daughter of Otto Bock.

During the tumult of World War II, the company resorted to the utilisation of forced laborers to sustain its operational endeavors. A company chronicle quotes former employees as saying that from 1942 onwards, around 100 Russian women aged between 18 and 22 were employed in the bandage, sewing and timber departments. Letters from Marie Bock also suggest that the entrepreneurial family used forced labourers not only in the company but also in the private household.

=== 1946-1989 ===
After World War II, when all the family's private assets as well as the factory in Königsee had been confiscated by the Soviet occupiers, the company settled in Duderstadt in southern Lower Saxony in 1946. In 1950, plastics were introduced into production for the first time. The invention of a braking knee joint with high stability, called the Jüpa knee, brought the economic breakthrough after 1949. Together with a newly developed balance device and two other apparatuses for prosthetic alignment, it was also in demand on the American market. In 1955, Ottobock exported the first 500 Jüpa knees to the U.S. The establishment of an American branch in Minneapolis in 1958 marked the beginning of the company's international sales structure.

In 1965, Max Näder introduced myoelectric arm prostheses to the market. For the first time, light and fragile as well as heavy objects could be grasped with them. In myoelectrics, weak electrical voltages control the prosthesis. Another development was a fitting solution for modular leg prostheses. The pyramid adapter, patented in 1969, connects the prosthetic foot, knee joint and stem and allows static corrections as well as the exchange of the modules. It remains an integrative element of innovative joints to this day.

=== 1990 until today ===
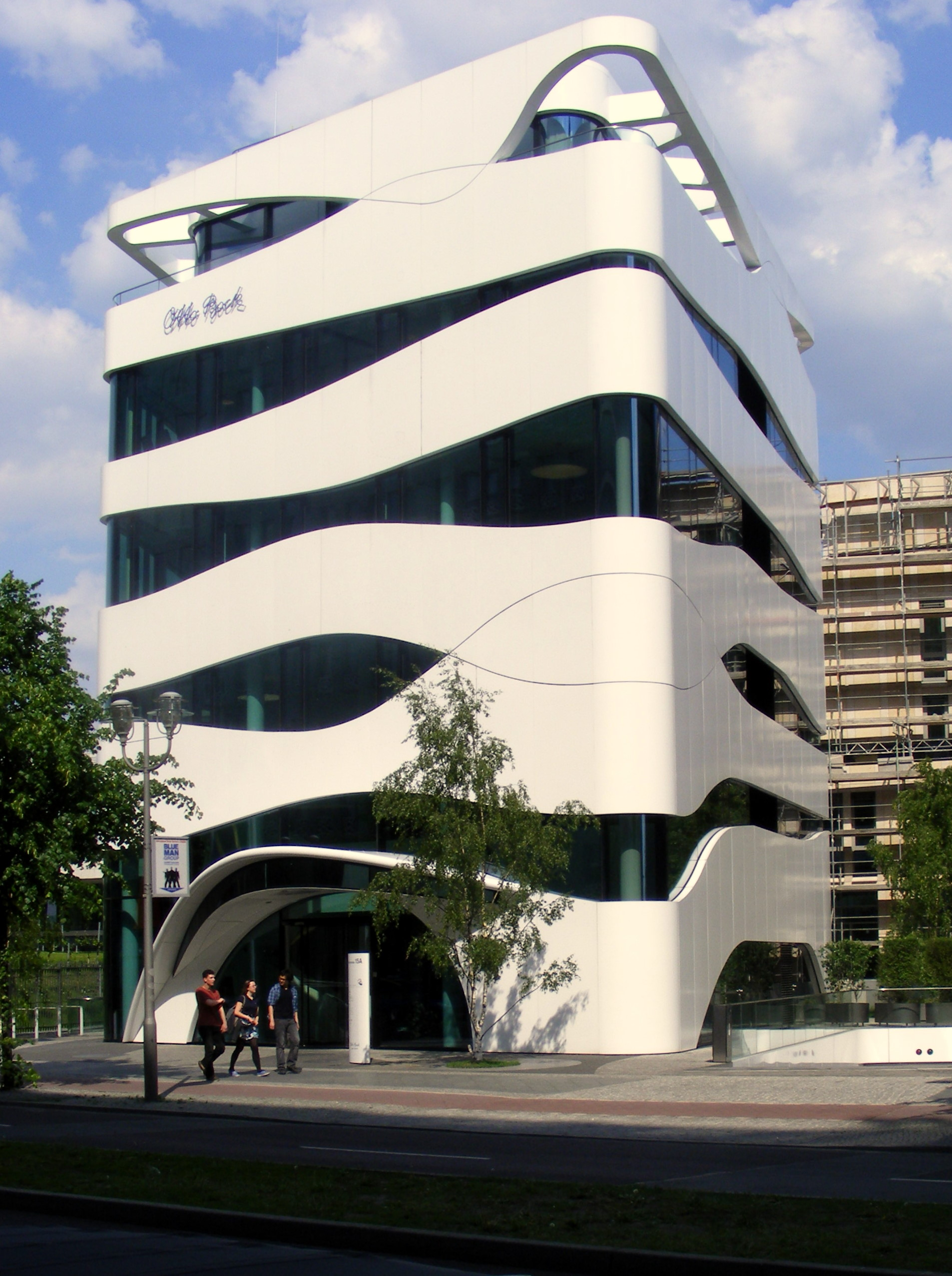
Science Center Medizintechnik in Berlin

After reunification, Hans Georg Näder took over the management of the family company from his father Max Näder, the son-in-law of company founder Otto Bock, in 1990. In the same year, the company was able to reacquire the old Ottobock site in Königsee. Today, manual wheelchairs, power wheelchairs, rehabilitation products for children and seat shell bases are produced at the former headquarters.

After a five-year development period, the world's first microprocessor-controlled knee joint, the C-Leg, was presented at the World Prosthetics Congress in Nuremberg in 1997. The company's 90th anniversary was also marked by the launch of the C-Leg.

To mark the company's 90th anniversary, the newly built Science Center Medical Technology was inaugurated in Berlin in June 2009. Until 2019, this building near Potsdamer Platz served both as a venue for the public exhibition Begreifen, was uns bewegt, and as a venue for congresses and seminars. On January 1, 2009, the subsidiary Otto Bock Mobility Solutions GmbH based in Königsee emerged from the HealthCare division. At the end of 2011, the old logo with the original signature of Otto Bock was replaced by a new international logo.

Advancements in electronic knee joint components and mechatronic prosthetic feet, led to enhanced individual fitting and personalised care for recipients. In 2011, these technological improvements enabled prosthetic users to walk backwards safely, overcome obstacles, or climb stairs in alternating steps for the first time.

In 2016, Ottobock was banned from operating in parts of Bosnia following an investigation by the Centre for Investigative Reporting that revealed the company was implicated in a scandal involving the misuse of public health funds in which prosthetic limb users were forced to buy Ottoboc's products.

In February 2017, Ottobock purchased the myoelectric arm or hand prostheses developed under the product name BeBionic from the British medical technology company Steeper. Since May 2017, the prostheses have been part of Ottobock's product range. In April 2017, Ottobock acquired Boston-based BionX Medical Technologies that manufactured a prosthetic foot and ankle product that utilises robotics technology. In June 2017, Swedish venture capitalist, EQT, acquired a 20 percent stake in Ottobock.

In 2018, Ottobock expanded its presence in the orthopaedic technology market, acquiring a 51 percent stake in Pohlig GmbH, a medium-sized orthopedic company based in Traunstein, Bavaria, and one of the most important orthopedic technology companies in Germany. In the same year, Pohlig GmbH became a wholly owned subsidiary of Ottobock.

During the period from 2012 to 2018, Hans Georg Näder withdrew substantial sums from Ottobock, exceeding the company's generated profits. This financial practice led to a significant decline in Ottobock's equity ratio, which dropeed from 50% in 2011 to 16% by 2021.

In late 2018, Ottobock's subsidiary, Sycor, planned a merger with the IT service provider Allgeier Enterprise Services. However, Ottobock cancelled the merger at the beginning of 2019. Following a series of acquisitions, Ottobock reported in 2019 that for the first time in its history the company's sales exceeded €1 billion.

In November 2019, Ottobock was compelled to sell the U.S.-based prothesis manufacturer Freedom Innovations LLC and divest all assets acquired via its purchase of the industry competitor in 2017. This sale was mandated after the U.S. Federal Trade Commission (FTC) filed an anti-competitive complain against Ottobock for breaking competition laws, incurring a damage of €78.1 million to Ottobock. The shares of Freedom Innovations were subsequently acquired by the French prosthesis manufacturer Proteor. In December 2019, the European Investment Bank announced that it will provide up to €100 million to Ottobock to support the company's development of new products.

In 2018, Ottobock's new generation of orthoses incorporated sensor technology to regulate the stance and swing phases of the leg throughout the gait cycle, enabling an almost natural walking pattern. Additionally, the company introduced an exoskeleton, the first product of the new Ottobock Bionic Exoskeletons business unit, designed to reduce strain during overhead work. Ottobock expanded its exoskeletons business after acquiring US-based exoskeleton startup SuitX, a spinoff from Berkeley Robotics and Human Engineering Laboratory, in November 2021.

At the end of 2021, Ottobock announced plans for an initial public offering slated for 2022. However, it was repeatedly postponed throughout the following year, accompanied by significant changes in the company's executive leadership. By the end of 2022, Handelsblatt reported that the offering had been abandoned due to unfavourable market conditions and that the financial investor EQT was considering a direct sale of its shares.

In May 2020, an Ottobock subsidiary based in Russia was fined by Russian anti-monopoly authorities for suspected cartel collusion which gave Ottobock and its co-conspirators a monopoly over state tenders for prosthetics, worth 168.1 million Russian Roubles.

In June 2023, it was announced that EQT, with the assistance of JP Morgan, had initiated the sale of its 20% stake in Ottobock. Additionally, a 10% stake held by Hans Georg Näder was included as part of the planned transaction. In December 2023, Näder Holding declared its intention to repurchase all of its shares. This buyback was completed in March 2024, with Näder securing €1.1 billion in credit funds for the transaction. Prior to the buyback, Hans Georg Näder sold his company Sycor, which had acquired Näder Ventures GmbH from Ottobock at the beginning of 2021.

In March 2023, Ottobock expanded its operations by acquiring the Brillinger chain of medical supply stores. That same month, Cranial Technologies filed a patent infringement lawsuit against Ottobock and Active Life, alleging that the companies used a patented process for 3D printing certain components of infant cranial helmets without authorisation.

In August 2025, several international newspapers reported on an upcoming initial public offering in fall 2025.

== Controversies ==
Despite the Russian invasion of Ukraine, Ottobock continues its operations in Russia, including maintaining a manufacturing site in Tolyatti.

== Corporate affairs ==
=== Ownership ===
The largest shareholder of Ottobock SE & Co. KGaA is Näder Holding GmbH & Co. KG, which is headquartered in Duderstadt. It is 100 percent owned by the owner family Näder, the direct descendants of the company founder Otto Bock. A further 20 percent is held by the Swedish financial investor EQT who completed the sell-back in March 2024 to the family Näder.

Hans Georg Näder publicly stated that he intended to float Ottobock via an initial public offering]scheduled for 2022, despite previously announcing the intention to take Ottobock public in 2015. In February 2022, the company delayed the initial public offering to September 2022. According to Reuters, Ottobock announced in May 2022 that it would not pursue the initial public offering due to market conditions, while company insiders claimed the company is unlikely to reach the target valuation of five to six billion euros.

=== Management ===
The Board of Directors manages the business of Ottobock SE & Co. KGaA and determines the basic guidelines and strategic direction of the company. It consists of four non-executive directors and currently two of the four executive directors (CEO/CSO and CFO). The Chairman of the Board of Directors is Hans Georg Näder.

The company's supervisory board is European co-determined and consists of six shareholder representatives and four employee representatives. It monitors the activities of the board of directors. The supervisory board is chaired by Bernd Bohr, long-time head of the automotive division of the Bosch Group. Other members include Gesche Joost and Michael Kaschke.

Since July 2022, the company has been managed operationally by four executive directors: Oliver Jakobi, chief executive officer (CEO) and chief revenue officer (CRO), Arne Kreitz, chief financial officer (CFO), Arne Jörn chief operating officer (COO) and chief technology officer (CTO) and Martin Böhm chief experience officer.

This leadership transition followed a significant restructuring by Hans Georg Näder, who ousted three of the four previous managing directors from the company over a period of three days following the intervention by Hans Georg Näder, who opposed with the plan to take the company public in 2022. These were namely Philipp Schulte-Noelle, Kathrin Dahnke, and Andreas Goppelt. Philipp Schulte-Noelle is a former senior executive of German healthcare public company Fresenius, who was appointed as the CEO of Ottobock in 2019 amid the plan to take Ottobock public. Kathrin Dahnke was hired by Ottobock in July 2021 after she left her position as CFO at German electric lights manufacturer Osram. Kathrin Dahnke told reporters just days before her departure that Ottobock still intends to go public.

=== Locations ===
By February 2022, the company had expanded its operations to a total of almost 52 sites distributed across North and South America, Europe, Asia, Africa and Australia. Ottobock SE & Co. KGaA is the global market leader in technical orthopedics/prosthetics, with sales and service locations in more than 50 countries.

At the end of 2022, Ottobock employed over 9,000 people worldwide. The company's corporate headquarters are located in Duderstadt, Germany, with additional German locations in Königsee, Hanover, Traunstein, and Berlin. A competence center and research and development workshop are situated in Göttingen. Ottobock maintains research and development facilities in other locations, including Duderstadt, Salt Lake City, and Vienna.

== Products and Business Areas ==
=== Prosthetics and orthotics ===
Since its inception, Ottobock has concentrated on developing prosthetic devices, and it has emerged as a global leader in the field of exo-prosthetics. Another focus area is orthotics, specifically designing devices that help individuals with partial leg paralysis regain mobility.

=== NeuroMobility ===
Ottobock's NeuroMobility division focuses on neuro-orthotics solutions alongside its rehabilitation and wheelchair business segments. Since 2018, the development of high-tech wheelchairs has been undertaken at the company's facility in Berlin. Before production begins, these wheelchairs undergo rigorous testing on a specialised test track and in an integrated workshop to ensure quality and functionalist. The production of the wheelchairs takes place in Königsee, Thuringia, where Ottobock maintains its manufacturing operations.

=== Patient Care ===
Ottobock operates more than 340 care centres worldwide. Additionally, the company continuously optimises processes within its orthopaedic workshops to enhance the quality and effectiveness of its treatments, orthotics and prosethic products.

=== Bionic Exoskeletons ===
In 2018, Ottobock established a new business division focusing on biomechanics, specifically through its Ottobock Bionic Exoskeletons unit. This division specialises in developing and marketing exoskeletons designed for use in industrial work settings to support people in physically demanding work, such as the automotive sector and smartphone manufacturing. The exoskeletons relieve strain on muscles and joints, for example during overhead work or heavy lifting activities.

In October 2021, Ottobock completed the acquisition of the US company SuitX. SuitX is a spin-off from the Robotics and Human Engineering Lab at the University of California, Berkeley, and focuses on the research and development of exoskeletons for both professional and medical applications. The acquisition aims to enhance Ottobock's development and distribution efforts in the exoskeleton technology space.

=== Ottobock Science Center ===
In 2009, Ottobock reestablished its presence in Berlin by opening the Science Center at Potsdamer Platz, marking a return to the city where the company was originally founded in Kreuzberg in 1919. The Science Center served as Ottobock's representative office and showroom in the capital for nine years. During its operation, it attracted over one million visitors from around the globe to its interactive exhibition, "Begreifen, was uns bewegt" ("Understanding What Moves Us"). In the summer of 2018, Ottobock relocated to the renovated former Bötzow Brewery buildings, leading to the closure of the Science Center Berlin to the public.

=== Ottobock Future Lab ===
Ottobock established a digital think tank known as the Ottobock Future Lab at the Bötzow Brewery, once Berlin's largest private brewery. After acquiring the site in 2010, Ottobock initiated a revitalization project based on a master plan designed by architect David Chipperfield. This redevelopment blended modern working environments with the brewery's historic brick and industrial architecture. The Future Lab serves as a hub where new products, technologies, and supply solutions are developed and tested by cross-functional teams. The site hosts a variety of digital start-ups and also houses employees from departments including IT, Human Resources, Marketing, Corporate Strategy, Corporate Communications, and Public Affairs.

== Paralympic Games ==
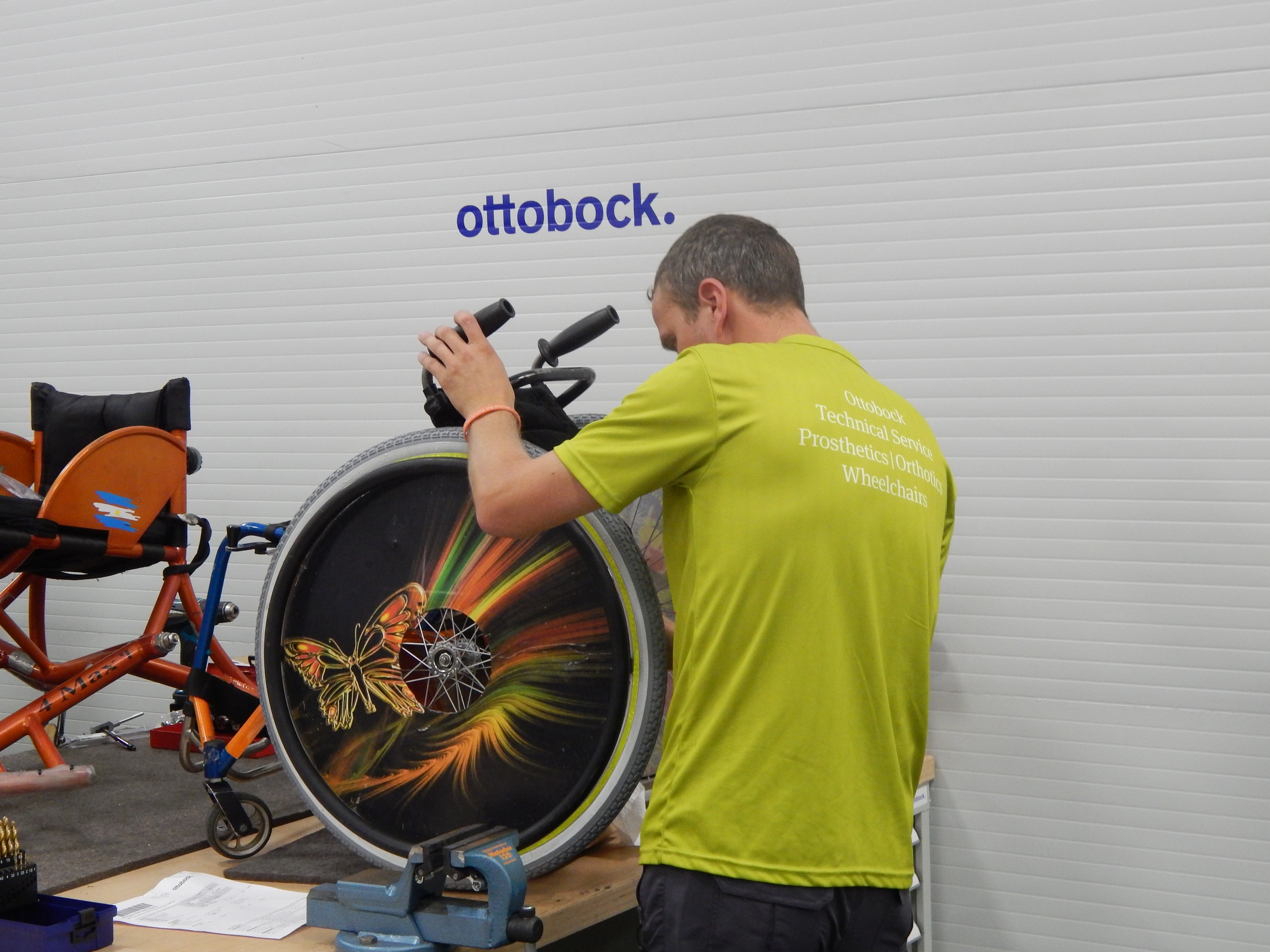
An Ottobock technician repairs a wheelchair at the 2016 Paralympic Games in Rio de Janeiro

Ottobock is an official global partner to the International Paralympic Committee (IPC) since 2005, and has been providing technical services at the Paralympic Games since the Summer Games in Seoul, 1988.

As an official technical service partner at the Paralympic Games, Ottobock provides support to athletes by offering services free of charge. Many athletes rely heavily on technical aids that undergo extreme stresses, especially wheelchairs in contact sports, which often suffer damage. To address this, Ottobock deploys a technical team on-site during the games and establishes workshops near the Paralympic village, and at key training and competition venues. The team performs repairs and maintenance on equipment, servicing athletes' regardless of nationality or the brand of aids used.

Advertising partners in this area include paralympians Johannes Floors, Léon Schäfer, Anna Schaffelhuber and Heinrich Popow.

The 2016 Paralympic Games in Rio de Janeiro marked the 13th games at which Ottobock provided technical services. This involved shipping 18 tonnes (18 long tons; 20 short tons) of equipment, including 15,000 spare parts, 1,100 wheelchair tyres, 70 running blades and 300 prosthetic feet, 300 kilometres (190 mi) from Duderstadt to the port at Bremerhaven, 10,100 kilometres (6,300 mi) by sea to Santos, and then 500 kilometres (310 mi) by road to Rio de Janeiro. At Seoul in 1988, four Ottobock technicians carried out 350 repairs; in Rio de Janeiro in 2016, 100 technicians from 29 countries speaking 26 languages carried out 3,361 repairs for 1,162 athletes, including 2,745 repairs to wheelchairs, 438 to prosthetics, and 178 to orthotics.

In Rio on 10 September, the IPC's president, Sir Philip Craven, announced that Ottobock had agreed to extend its world-wide partnership to the end of 2020, encompassing the 2020 Paralympic Games in Tokyo.
