= Myodocarpus angustialatus =

Conservation status
- Vulnerable (IUCN 2.3)

Scientific classification
- Kingdom: Plantae
- Clade: Tracheophytes
- Clade: Angiosperms
- Clade: Eudicots
- Clade: Asterids
- Order: Apiales
- Family: Myodocarpaceae
- Genus: Myodocarpus
- Species: M. angustialatus

Binomial name
- Myodocarpus angustialatus Lowry ined.

Species of flowering plant

Myodocarpus angustialatus is the provisional name for a threatened species of plant in the family Myodocarpaceae, which has not yet been formally described scientifically. It is endemic to New Caledonia.
