= D. balansae =

D. balansae may refer to:

- Dacrydium balansae, a conifer species found only in New Caledonia
- Dalbergia balansae, a plant species found in China and Vietnam
- Delarbrea balansae, a flowering plant species endemic to New Caledonia

== See also ==
- Balansae
