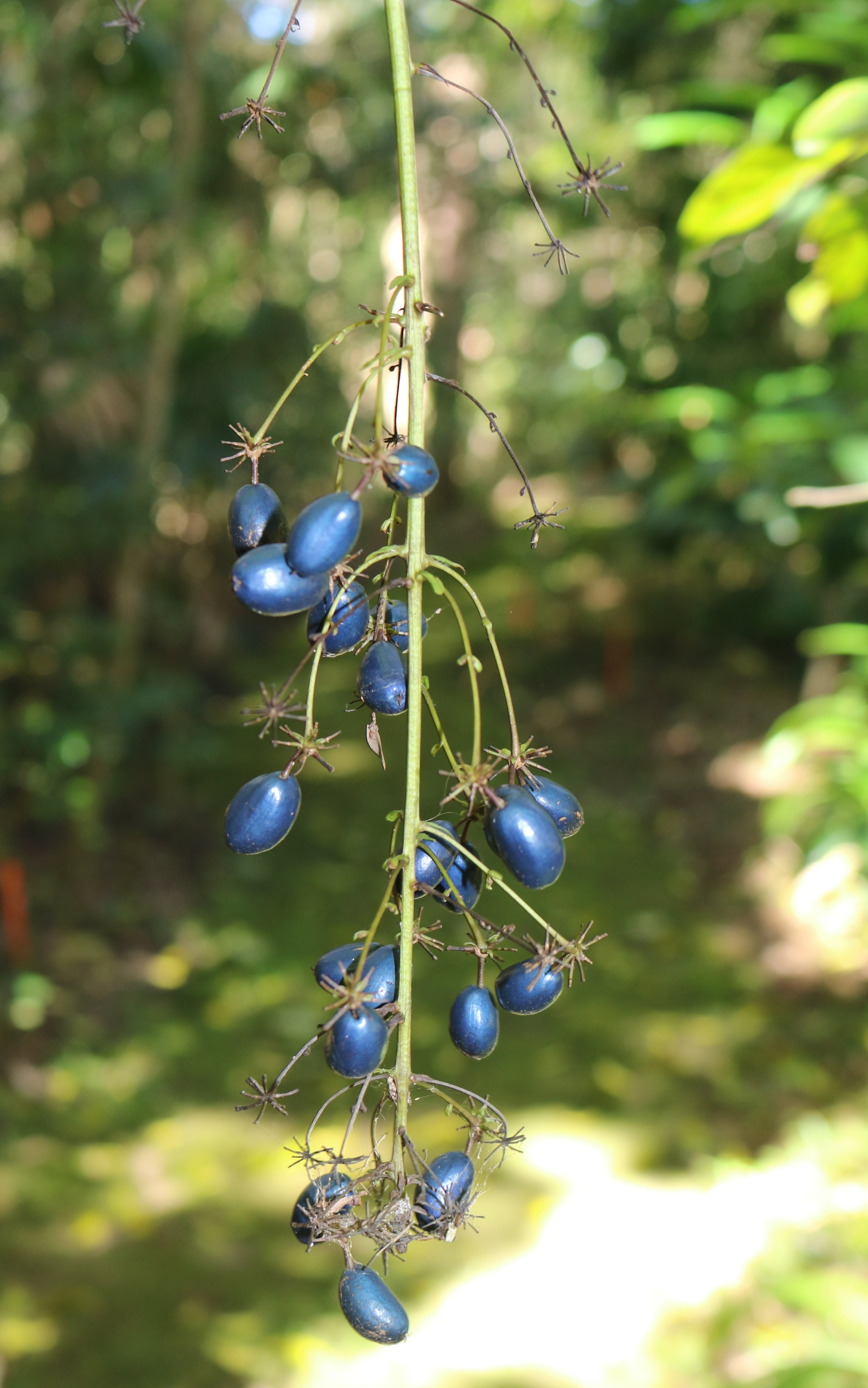

Scientific classification
- Kingdom: Plantae
- Clade: Tracheophytes
- Clade: Angiosperms
- Clade: Eudicots
- Clade: Asterids
- Order: Apiales
- Family: Myodocarpaceae
- Genus: Delarbrea
- Species: D. michieana

Binomial name
- Delarbrea michieana (F.Muell.) F.Muell.

= Delarbrea michieana =

Species of flowering plant

Delarbrea michieana, the blue nun, is a species of flowering plant of family Myodocarpaceae. A widespread shrub or small tree, it is found in rainforest between Tully and Cooktown in tropical Queensland, Australia.
