= Dash Robotics, Inc. =

Dash Robotics, Inc. is a toy robotics company founded in 2013 Hayward, California as part of Wonder Workshop. Their main focus is on prototyping and manufacturing smart toys (sometimes called "connected toys"). Often mistakenly affiliated with UC Berkeley, they are not a part of the university although many of the company's members met there.

In February 2026, MORAVIA Education, part of MORAVIA Consulting, was launched in the United States in Celebration, Florida, and acquired Wonder Workshop’s assets.

== Products ==
They are most widely known for creating Kamigami Robots, a biomimetic, foldable robot that was funded via Kickstarter in 2015. Kamigami received attention for their unique biomimetic motion, which mimics that of a cockroach. The platform allows kids build their own robotic bugs. The original concepts behind the robot's motion are attributed to Dr. Robert Full, a biologist at UC Berkeley, and can be seen outlined in his Ted Talk. Mattel licensed the Kamigami brand in spring of 2017, and oversaw the national release in fall of 2017 as part of their new emphasis on STEM and "digital age" toys.

Previous products include Dash Beta and Dash VR. Dash Beta was a cardboard, app-controlled robot that required glue to be assembled, and acted as a predecessor to Kamigami. Dash Beta is no longer in production.

== Awards ==
- Maker Faire Editor's Choice

== See also ==
- Smart toy
- Connected toys
