= Delarbrea balansae =

Scientific classification
- Kingdom: Plantae
- Clade: Tracheophytes
- Clade: Angiosperms
- Clade: Eudicots
- Clade: Asterids
- Order: Apiales
- Family: Myodocarpaceae
- Genus: Delarbrea
- Species: D. balansae

Binomial name
- Delarbrea balansae (Baill.) Lowry & G.M.Plunkett

Synonyms
- Pseudosciadium balansae Baill.

Species of flowering plant

Delarbrea balansae is a species of flowering plant of family Myodocarpaceae. It is endemic to New Caledonia. It has previously been classified as the sole member of genus Pseudosciadium, but molecular and morphological studies point to its inclusion in the genus Delarbrea.
