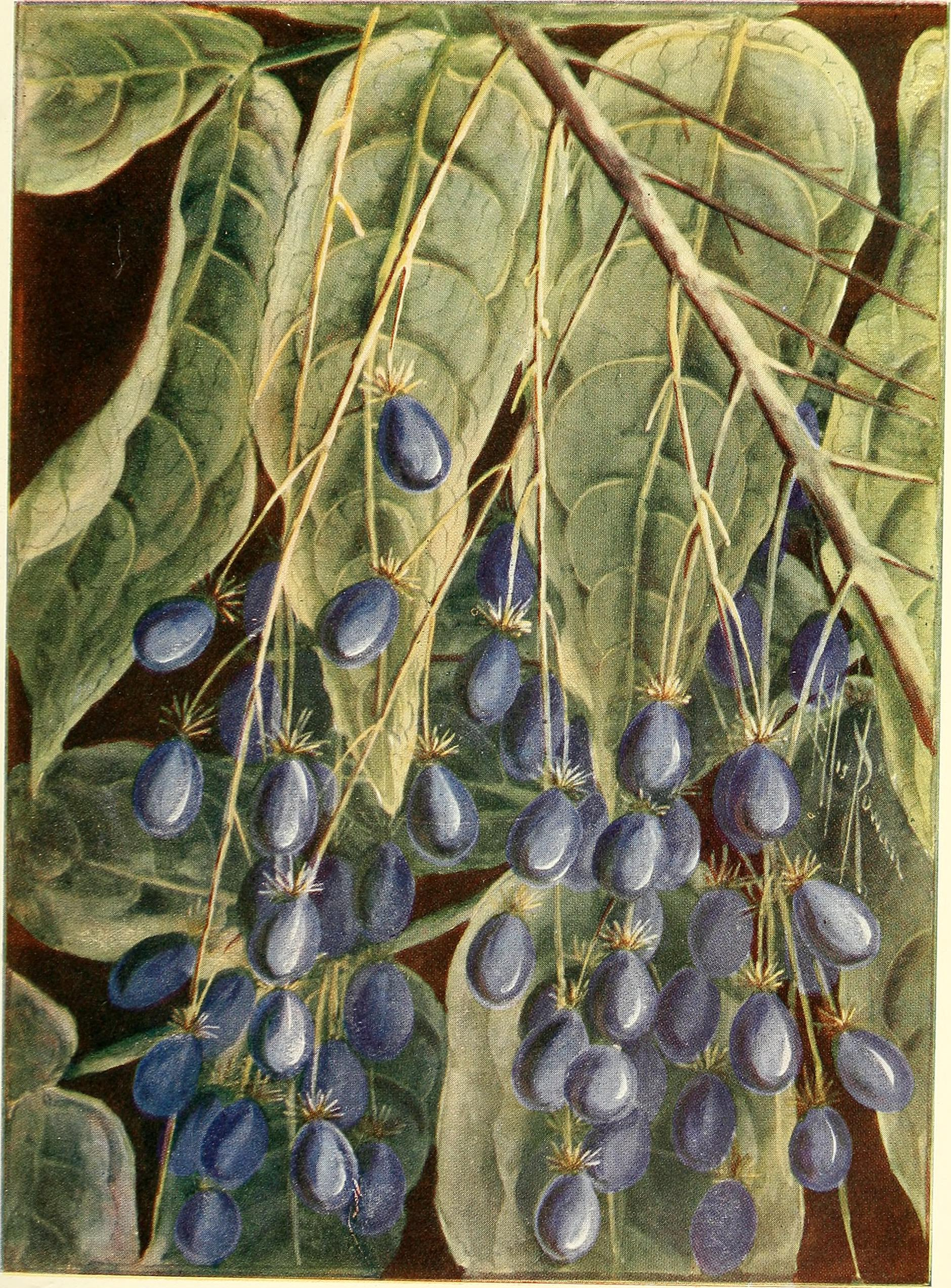
- Delarbrea michieana Illustration by Ellis Rowan

Scientific classification
- Kingdom: Plantae
- Clade: Tracheophytes
- Clade: Angiosperms
- Clade: Eudicots
- Clade: Asterids
- Order: Apiales
- Family: Myodocarpaceae
- Genus: Delarbrea; Vieill.

Synonyms
- Porospermum F.Muell.; Pseudosciadium Baill.

= Delarbrea =

Genus of flowering plants

Delarbrea is a genus of plants in family Myodocarpaceae, which contains only one other genus, Myodocarpus.

== Species ==
The following seven species are accepted by Plants of the World Online as of 10 March 2024:

- Delarbrea balansae (Baill.) Lowry & G.M.Plunkett – New Caledonia
- Delarbrea collina Vieill. – New Caledonia
- Delarbrea harmsii R.Vig. – New Caledonia
- Delarbrea longicarpa R.Vig. – New Caledonia
- Delarbrea michieana (F.Muell.) F.Muell. – Queensland
- Delarbrea montana R.Vig. – New Caledonia
- Delarbrea paradoxa Vieill. – Lesser Sunda Is., Maluku, New Guinea, Bismarck Archipelago, Solomon Is., New Caledonia, Vanuatu
