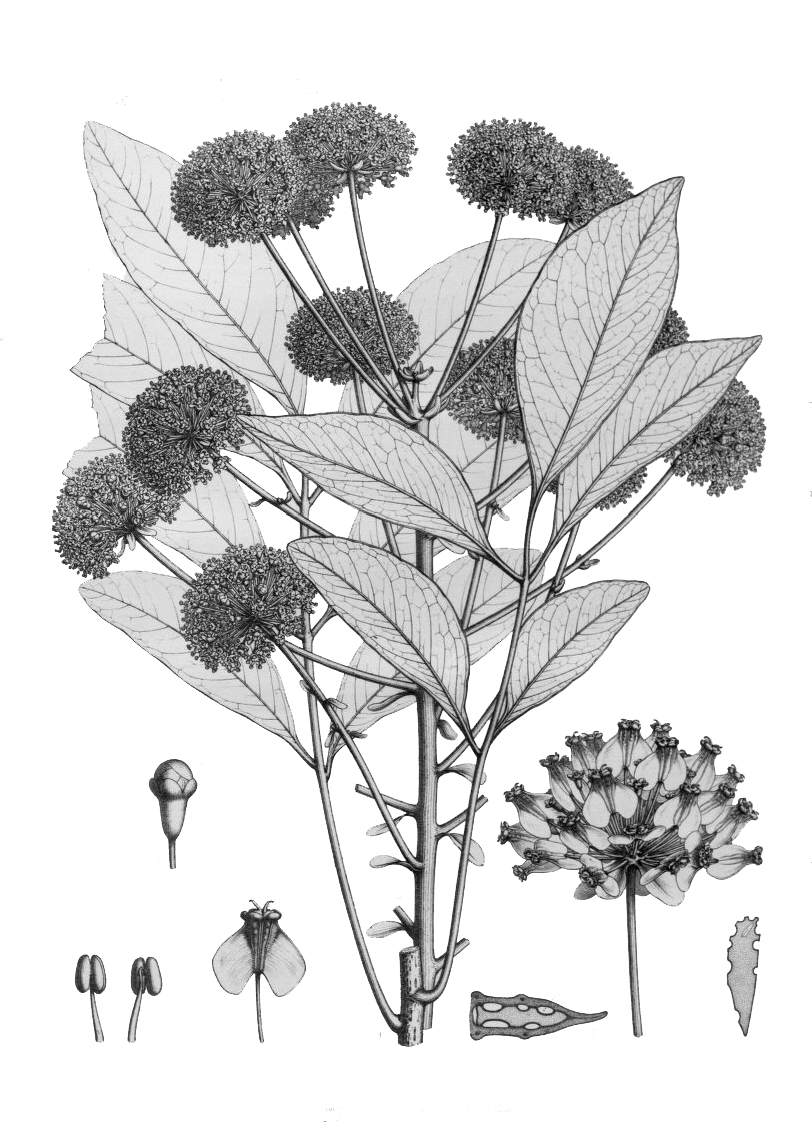
- Myodocarpus pinnatus

Scientific classification
- Kingdom: Plantae
- Clade: Tracheophytes
- Clade: Angiosperms
- Clade: Eudicots
- Clade: Asterids
- Order: Apiales
- Family: Myodocarpaceae
- Genus: Myodocarpus; Brongn. & Gris

= Myodocarpus =

Genus of flowering plants

Myodocarpus is a genus of plants in the family Myodocarpaceae. It is endemic to New Caledonia. The only other genus of the family is Delarbrea.

== List of species ==
- Myodocarpus crassifolius
- Myodocarpus fraxinifolius
- Myodocarpus gracilis
- Myodocarpus involucratus
- Myodocarpus lanceolatus
- Myodocarpus pinnatus
- Myodocarpus simplicifolius
- Myodocarpus vieillardii
