= Surface tension biomimetics =

Surface tension is one of the areas of interest in biomimetics research. Surface tension forces will only begin to dominate gravitational forces below length scales on the order of the fluid's capillary length, which for water is about 2 millimeters. Because of this scaling, biomimetic devices that utilize surface tension will generally be very small, however there are many ways in which such devices could be used.

== Applications ==
=== Coatings ===
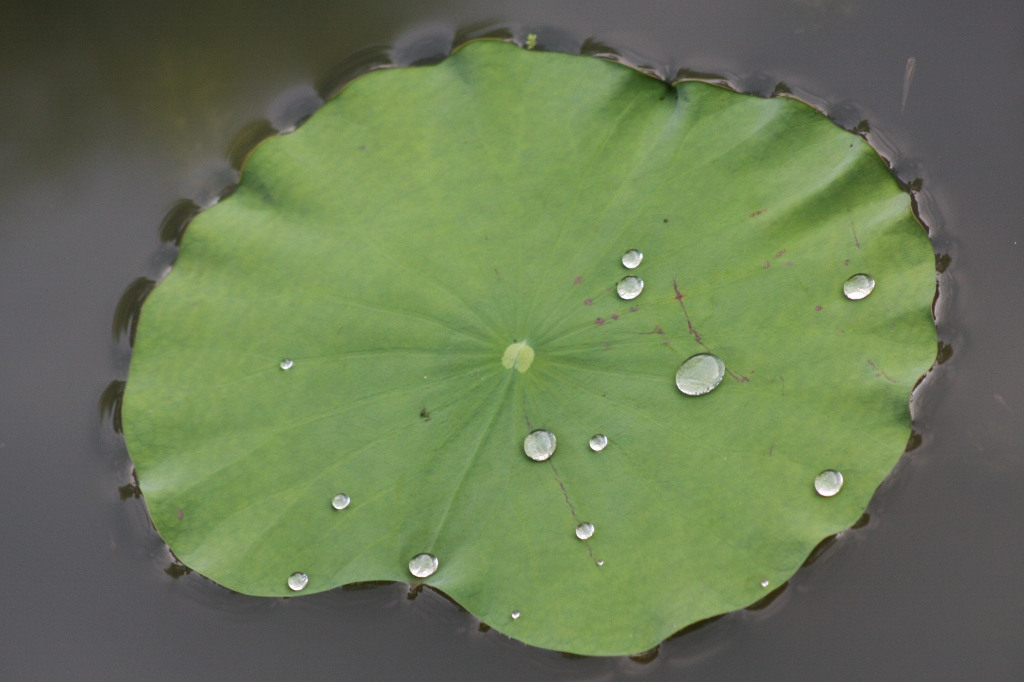
Lotus Leaf (5780807820)

Unitary roughness structure versus hierarchical structure

A lotus leaf is well known for its ability to repel water and self-clean. Yuan and his colleagues fabricated a negative mold of alotus leaf from polydimethylsiloxane (PDMS) to capture the tiny hierarchical structures integral for the leaf's ability to repel water, known as the lotus effect. The lotus leaf's surface was then replicated by allowing a copper sheet to flow into the negative mold with the assistance of ferric chloride and pressure. The result was a lotus leaf-like surface inherent on the copper sheet. Static water contact angle measurements of the biomimetic surface were taken to be 132° after etching the copper and 153° after a stearic acid surface treatment to mimic the lotus leaf's waxy coating. A surface that mimics the lotus leaf could have numerous applications by providing water repellent outdoor gear.

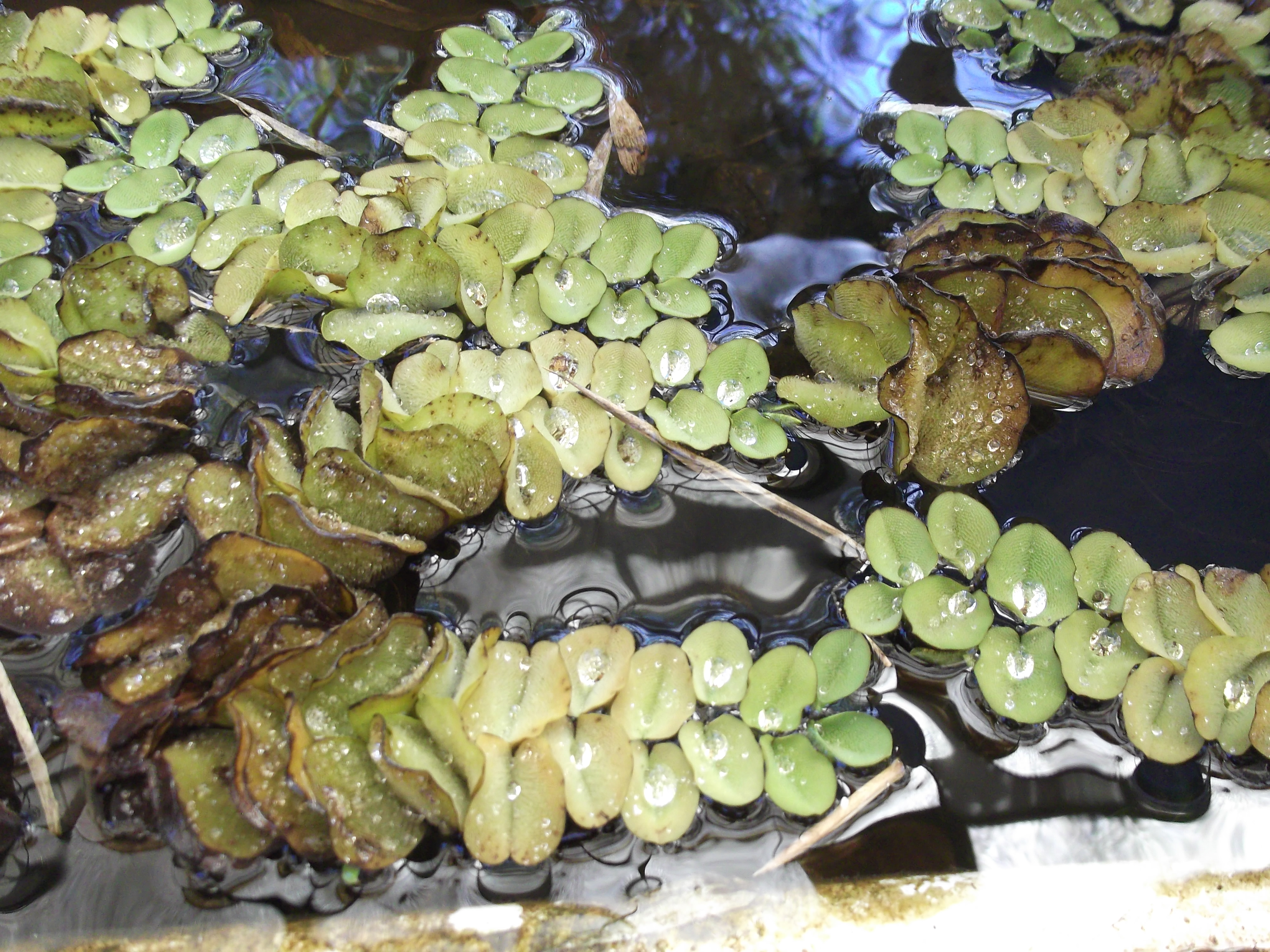
Salvinia auriculata-lake-yercaud-salem-India

Various species of floating fern are able to sustain a liquid-solid barrier of air between the fern and the surrounding water when they are submerged. Like the lotus leaf, floating fern species have tiny hierarchical structures that prevent water from wetting the plant surface. Mayser and Barthlott demonstrated this ability by submerging different species of the floating fern salvinia in water inside a pressure vessel to study how the air barrier between the leaf and surrounding water react to changes in pressure that would be similar to those experienced by the hull of a ship. Much other research is ongoing using these hierarchical structures in coatings on ship hulls to reduce viscous drag effects.

=== Biomedical ===
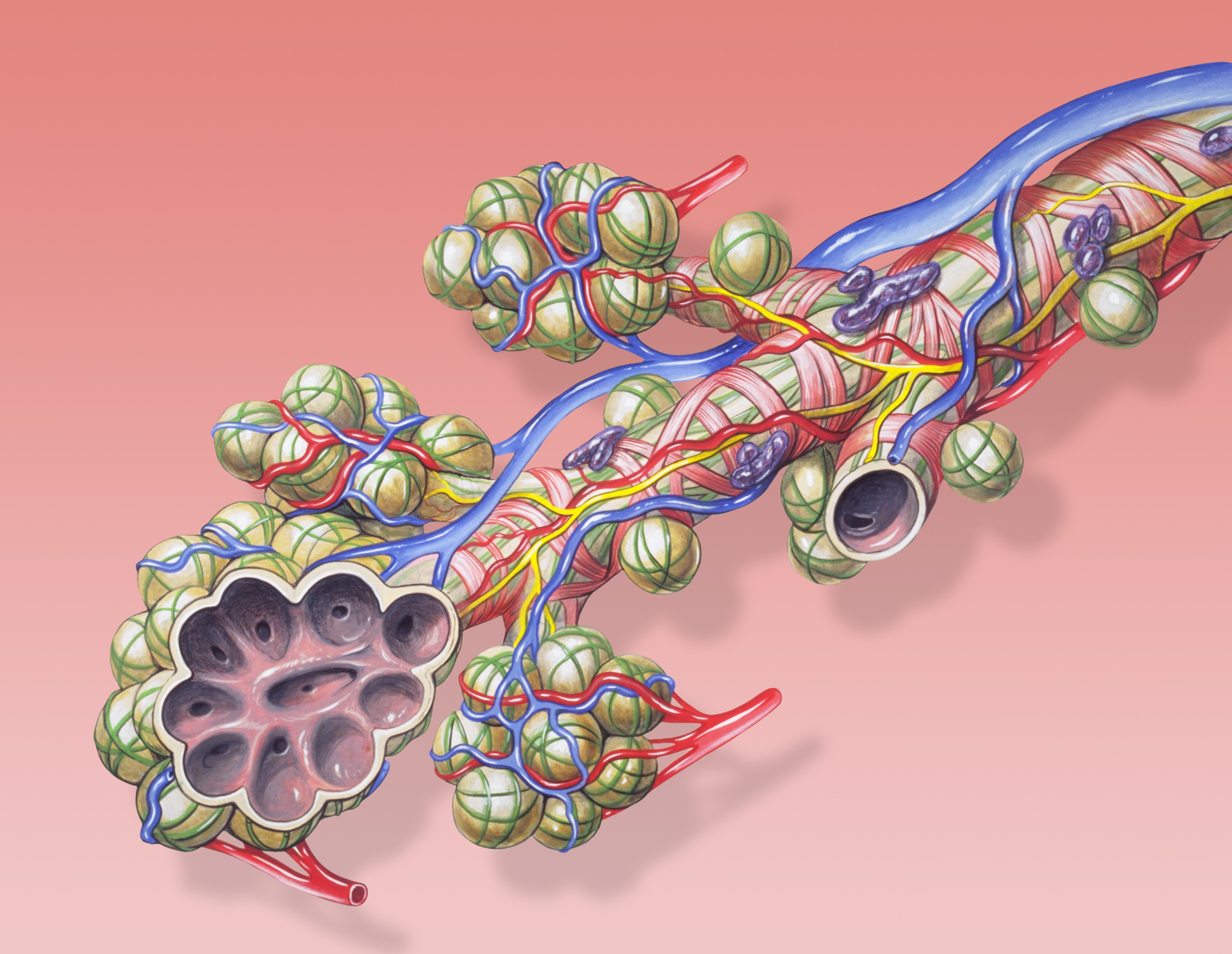
Bronchial anatomy

A lung is composed of many small sacks called alveoli that allow oxygen and carbon dioxide to diffuse in and out of the blood respectively as the blood is passed through small capillaries that surround these alveoli. Surface tension is exploited by alveoli by means of a surfactant that is produced by one of the cells and released to lower the surface tension of the fluid coating the inside of the alveoli to prevent these sacks from collapsing. Huh and his fellow researchers created a lung mimic that replicated the function of native alveolar cells. An extracellular matrix of gel, human alveolar epithelial cells, and human pulmonary microvascular endothelial cells were cultured on a polydimethylsiloxane membrane that was bound in a flexible vacuum diaphragm. Pressurization cycles of the vacuum diaphragm, which simulated breathing, showed similar form and function to an actual lung. The type II cells were also shown to emit the same surfactant that lowered the surface tension of the fluid coating the lung mimic. This research will hopefully some day lead to the creation of lungs that could be grown for patients that need to have a transplant or repair performed.

=== Locomotion ===
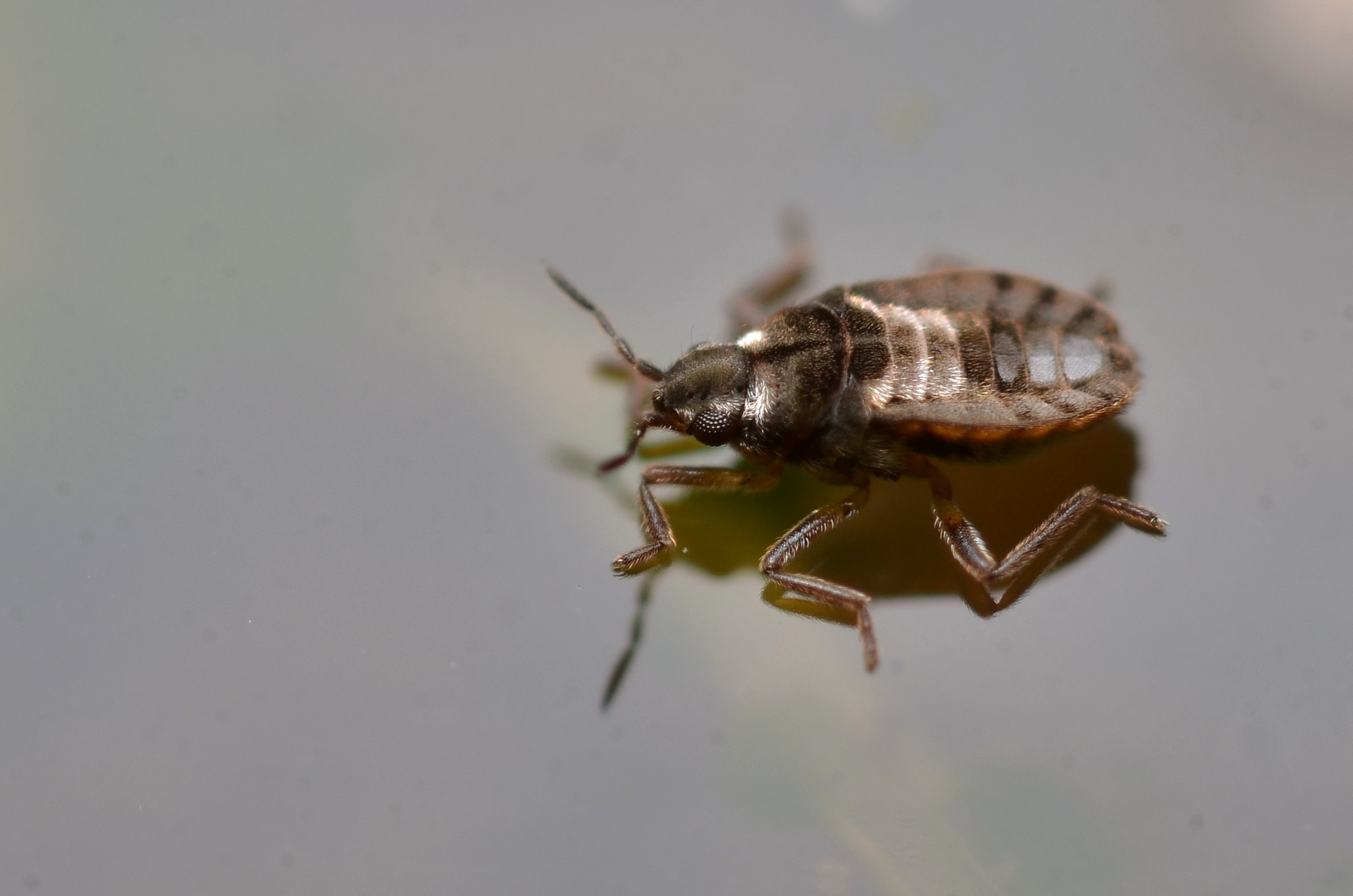
20140427 130230 7250M

Microvelia exploit surface tension by creating a surface tension gradient that propels them forward by releasing a surfactant behind them through a tongue-like protrusion. Biomimetic engineering was used in a creative and fun way to make and edible cocktail boat that mimicked the ability of microvelia to propel themselves on the surface of water by means of a phenomenon called the marangoni effect. Burton and her colleagues used 3D printing to make small plastic boats that released different types of alcohols behind the boat to lower the surface tension and create a surface tension gradient that propelled each boat. This type of propulsion could one day be used to make sea vessels more efficient.

=== Actuators ===
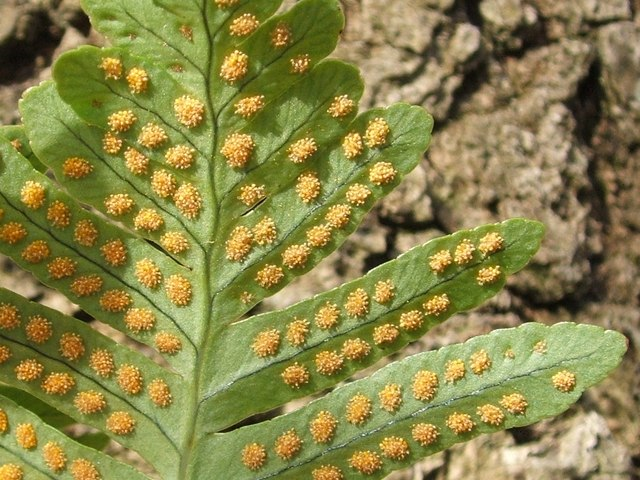
Polypody (a fern) - the underside - geograph.org.uk - 974672

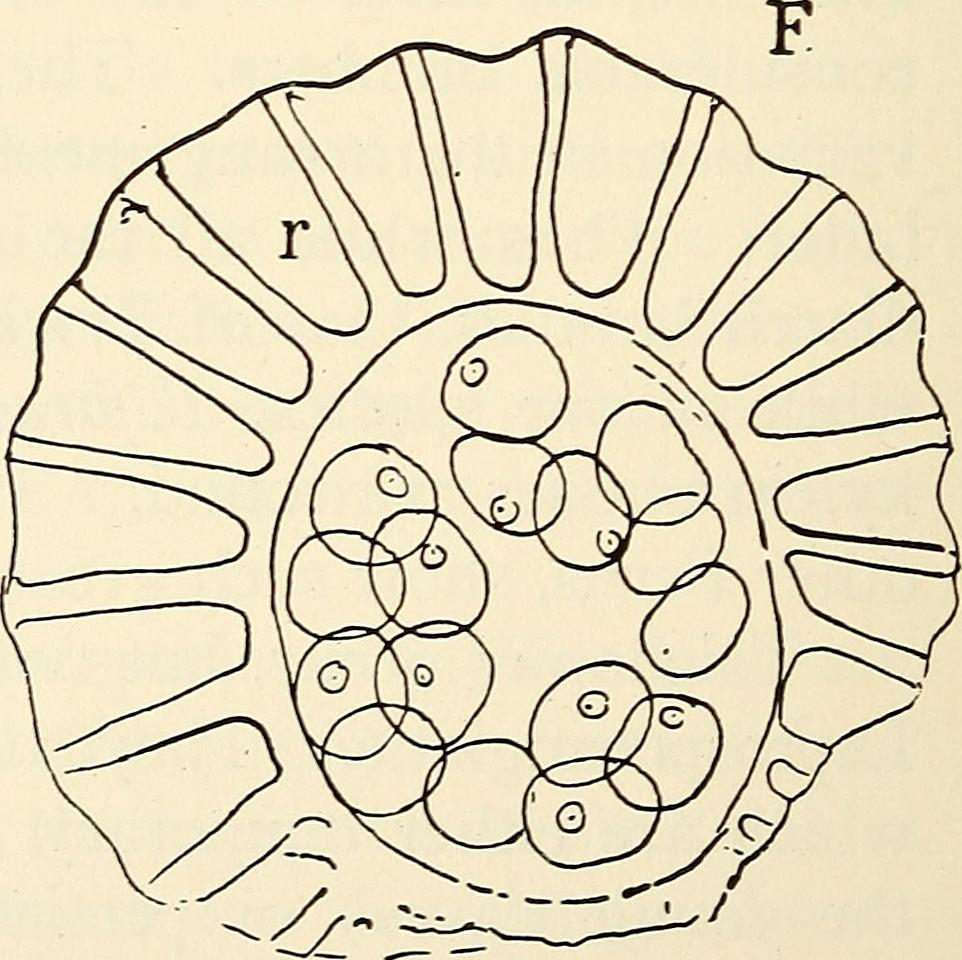
Image from page 395 of "The structure and development of mosses and ferns (Archegoniatae)" (1918) (14598564448)

Fern sporangia consist of hygroscopic ribs that protrude from a spine on the part of the plant that encapsulate spores in a sack (diagram). A capillary bridge is formed when water condenses on to the surface of these spines. When this water evaporates, surface tension forces between each rib cause the spine to retract and rip open the sack, spilling the spores. Borno and her fellow researchers fabricated a biomimetic device from polydimethylsiloxane using standard photolithography techniques. The devices used the same hygroscopic ribs and spine that resemble fern sporangia. The researchers varied the dimensions and spacing of the features of the device and were able to fine-tune and predict movements of the device as a whole in hopes of using a similar device as a microactuator that can perform functions using free energy from a humid atmosphere.

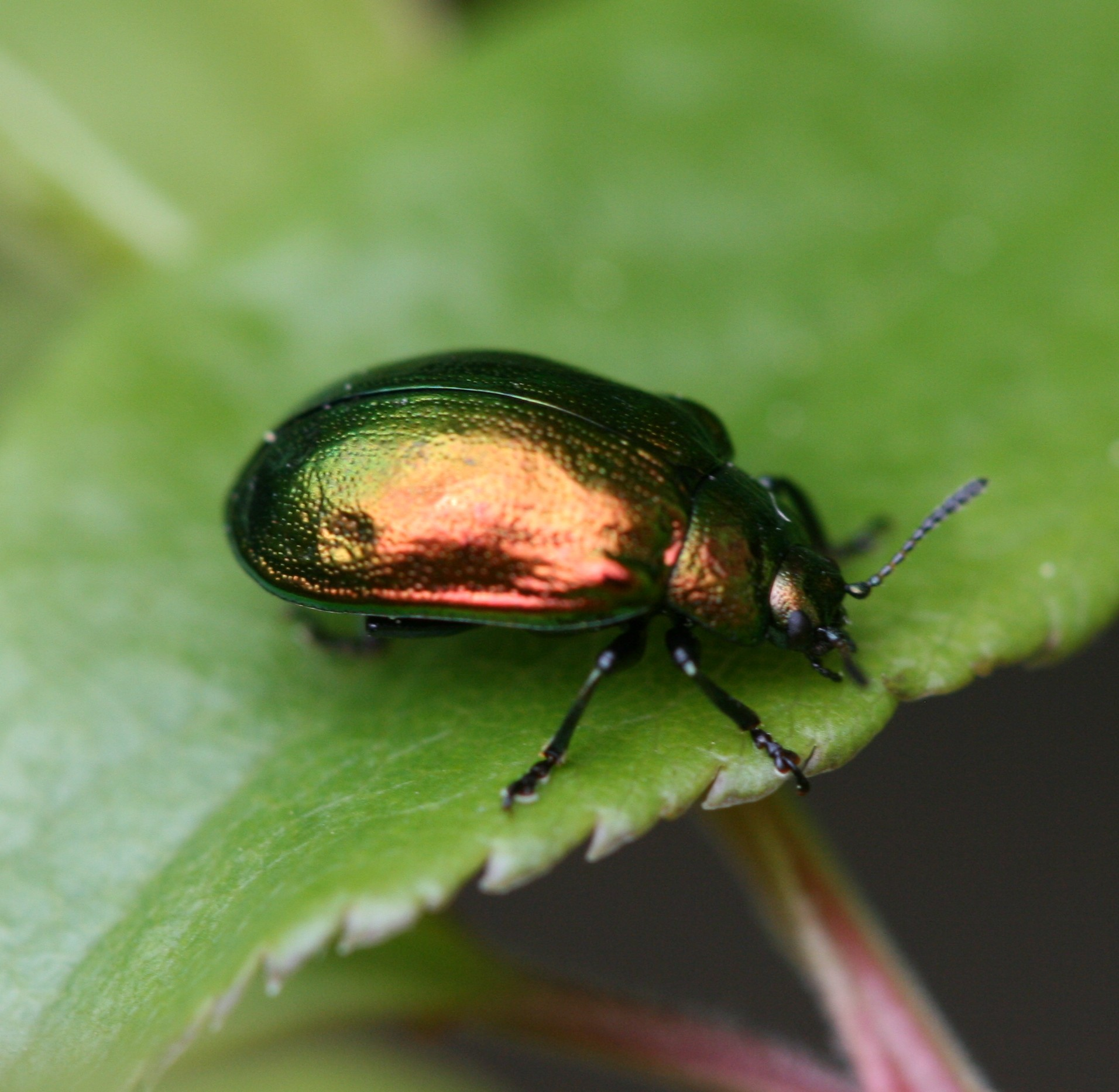
Leaf Beetle (Gastrophysa viridula) - male

A leaf beetle has an incredible ability to adhere to dry surfaces by using numerous capillary bridges between the tiny hair-like setae on its feet. Vogel and Steen noted this and designed and constructed a switchable wet adhesion mechanism that mimics this ability. They used standard photolithography techniques to fabricate a switchable adhesion gripper that used a pump driven by electro-osmosis to create many capillary bridges that would hold on to just about any surface. The leaf beetle can also reverse this effect by trapping air bubbles between its setae to walk on wet surfaces or under water. This effect was demonstrated by Hosoda and Gorb when they constructed a biomimetic surface that could adhere objects to surfaces under water. Using this technology could help to create autonomous robots that would be able to explore treacherous terrain that is otherwise too dangerous to explore.

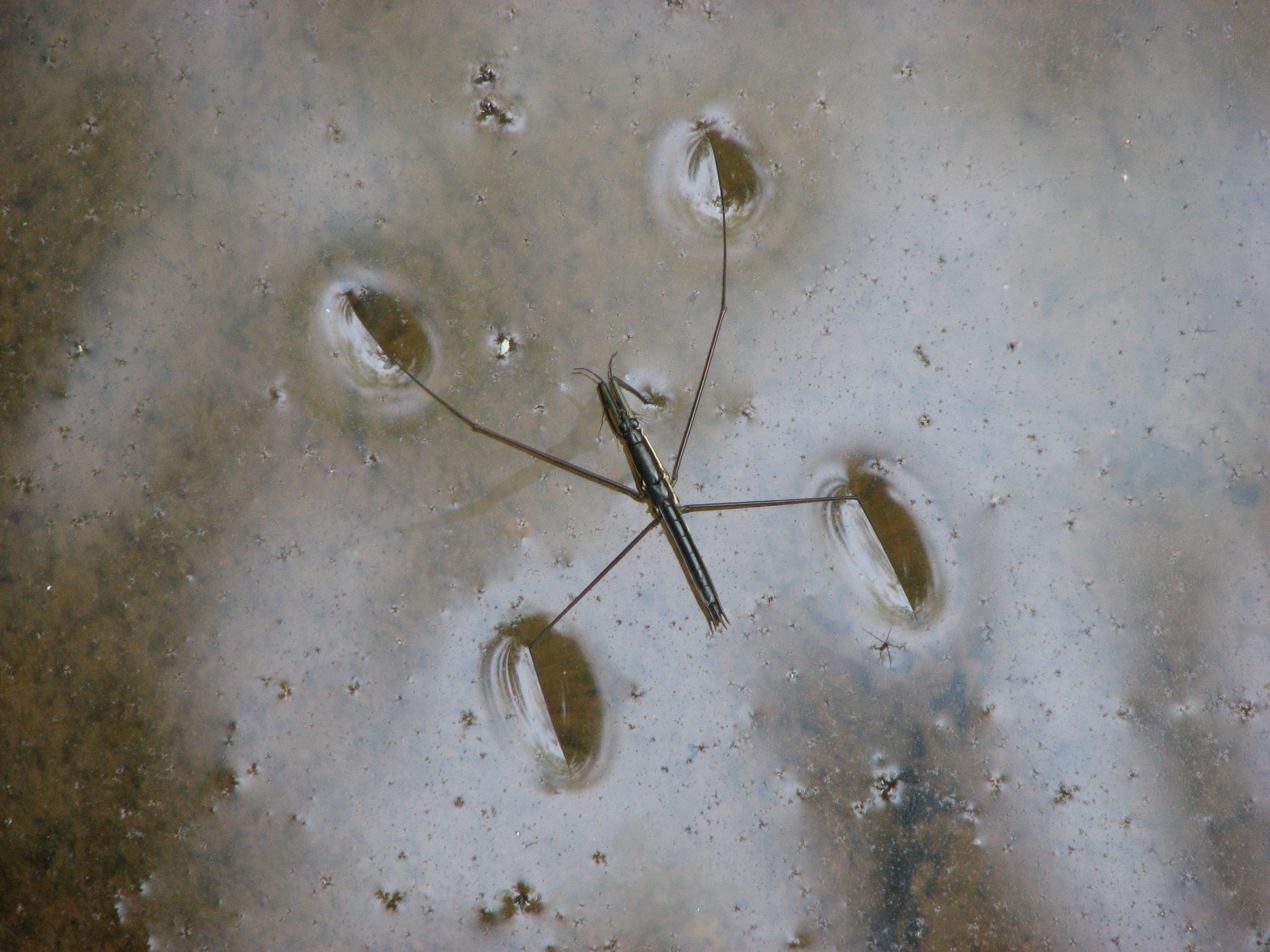
Water strider, from Kerala

Various life forms found in nature exploit surface tension in different ways. Hu and his colleagues looked at a few examples to create devices that mimic the abilities of their natural counterparts to walk on water, jump off the liquid interface, and climb menisci. Two such devices were a rendition of the water strider. Both devices mimicked the form and function of a water strider by incorporating a rowing motion of one pair of legs to propel the device, however one was powered with elastic energy and the other was powered by electrical energy. This research compared the various biomimetic devices to their natural counterparts by showing the difference between many physical and dimensionless parameters. This research could one day lead to small, energy efficient water walking robots that could be used to clean up spills in waterways.

=== Environment ===
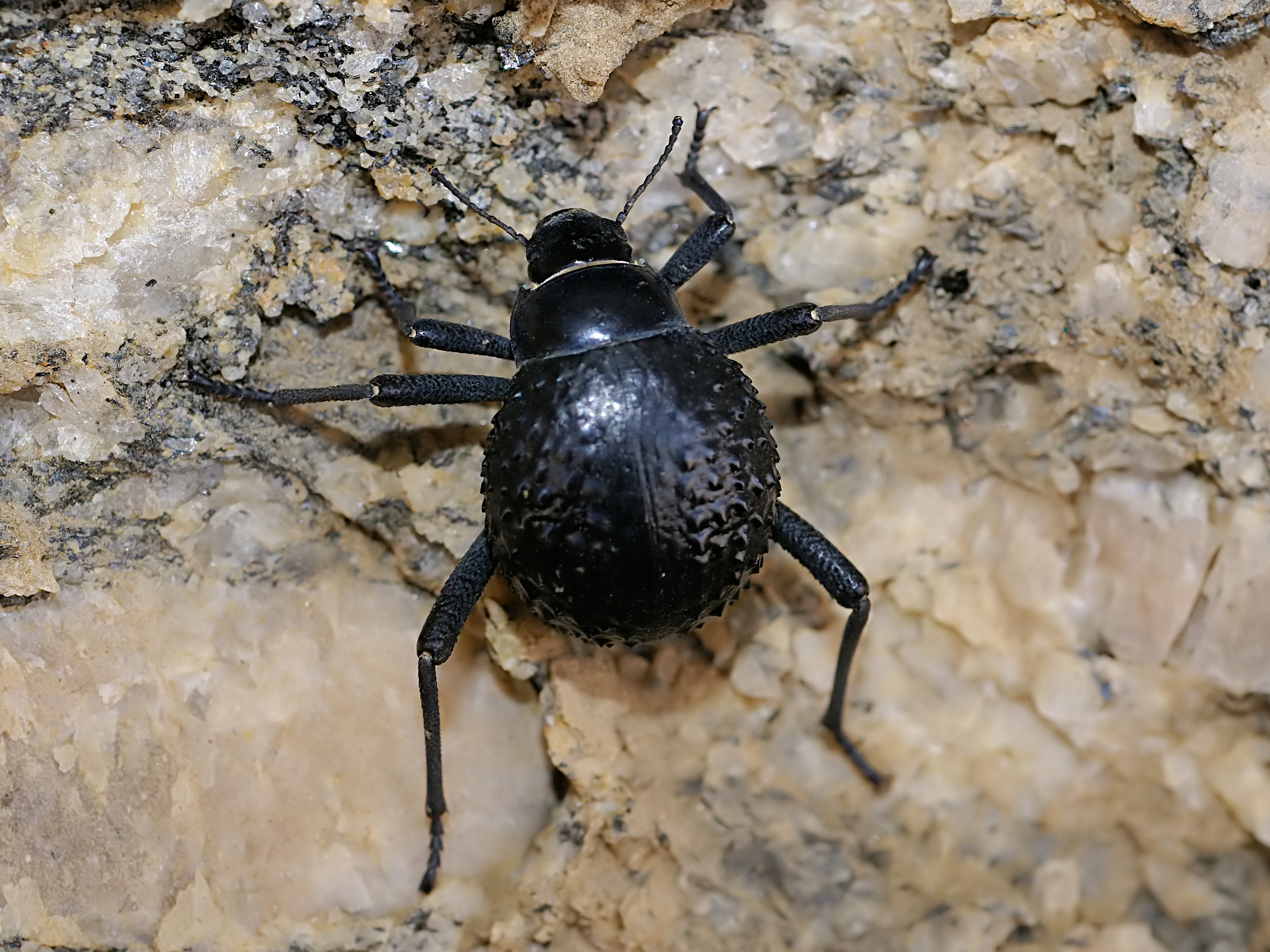
stenocara dentata

The Stenocara beetle, a native of the Namib Desert has a unique structure on its body that allows it to capture water from a humid atmosphere. In the Namib Desert, rain is not a very common occurrence, but on some mornings a dense fog will roll over the desert. The stenocara beetle uses tiny raised hydrophilic spots on its hydrophobic body to collect water droplets from the fog. Once these droplets are large enough, they can detach from these spots and roll down the beetle's back and into its mouth. Garrod et al. has demonstrated a biomimetic surface that was created using standard photolithography and plasma etching to create hydrophilic spots on a hydrophobic substrate for water collection. The optimal sizing and spacing of these spots that allowed the most water to be collected was similar to the spacing of the spots on the body of the stenocara beetle. Currently, this surface technology is being studied to implement as a coating on the inside of a water bottle the will allow the water bottle to self fill if left open in a humid environment, and could help to provide aid where water is scarce.
