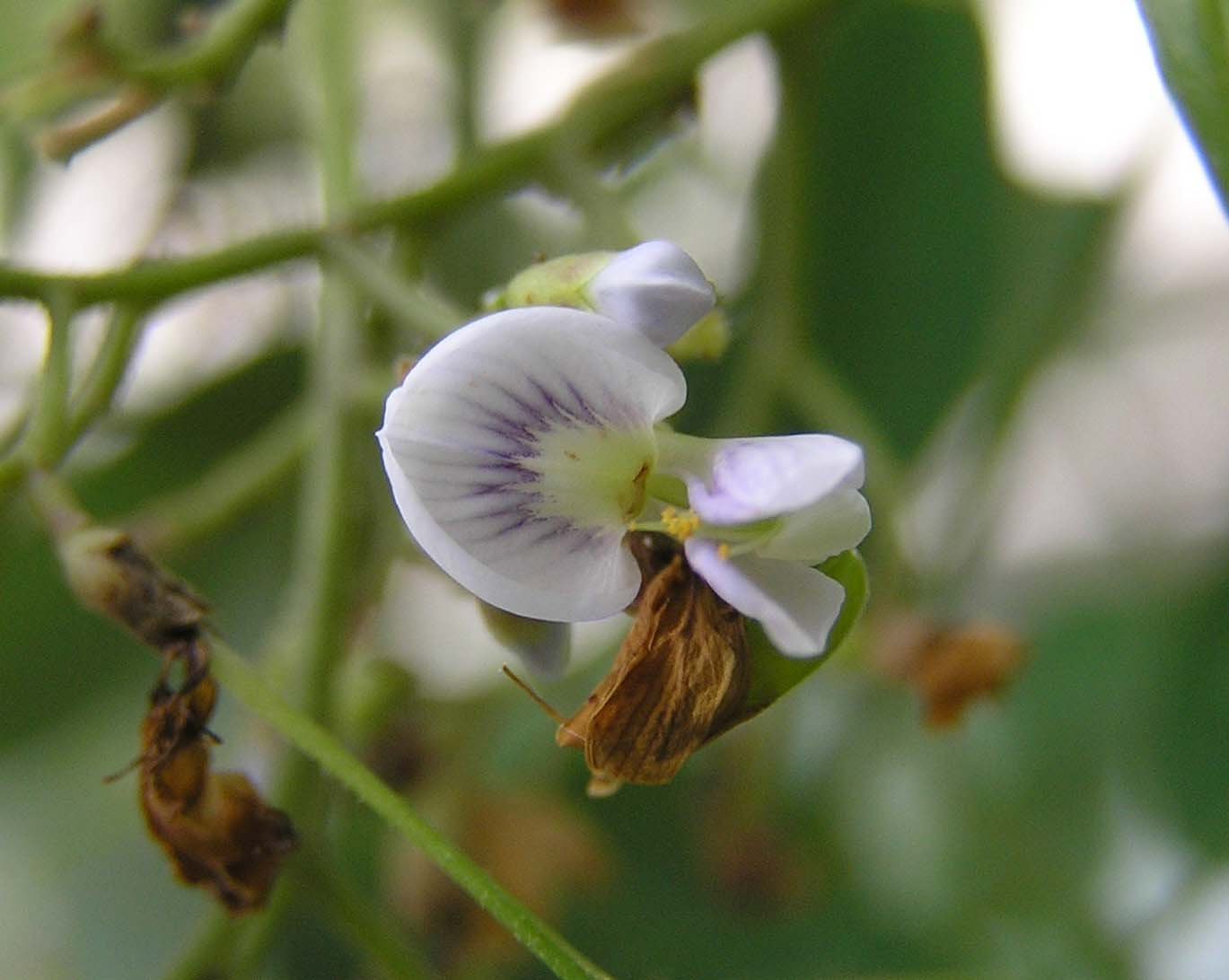

Conservation status
- Least Concern (IUCN 3.1)

Scientific classification
- Kingdom: Plantae
- Clade: Tracheophytes
- Clade: Angiosperms
- Clade: Eudicots
- Clade: Rosids
- Order: Fabales
- Family: Fabaceae
- Subfamily: Faboideae
- Genus: Dalbergia
- Species: D. assamica

Binomial name
- Dalbergia assamica Benth.

Synonyms
- Amerimnon assamicum (Benth.) Kuntze; Dalbergia assamica var. laccifera (Eberh. & Dubard) Niyomdham; Dalbergia balansae Prain; Dalbergia hupeana var. laccifera Eberh. & Dubard; Dalbergia lanceolaria var. assamica (Benth.) Thoth.; Dalbergia prazeri Prain; Dalbergia szemaoensis Prain

= Dalbergia assamica =

Species of legume

Dalbergia assamica, also known as Dalbergia balansae, is a species of legume in the family Fabaceae. It is a tree native to southeastern Asia, ranging from the eastern Himalayas, Bangladesh, and northeastern India through Indochina to southern China.

It grows in lowland and submontane mixed deciduous and dry evergreen forests, scrub, wasteland around villages, and abandoned shifting cultivation sites from 100 to 800 metres elevation.

The species was described by George Bentham in 1852. The species' taxonomic status is unsettled, as some authorities recognize D. balansae as a separate species, or consider D. assamica a synonym of D. balansae.
