= Wonder Workshop =

Education and robotics startup

- Type: Private
- Industry: Robotics and artificial intelligence
- Founded: 2012
- Founder: Vikas Gupta; Saurabh Gupta; Mikal Greaves
- Headquarters: San Mateo, USA
- Products: Dash, Dot, Cue, Dot Creativity Kit
- Website: www.makewonder.com

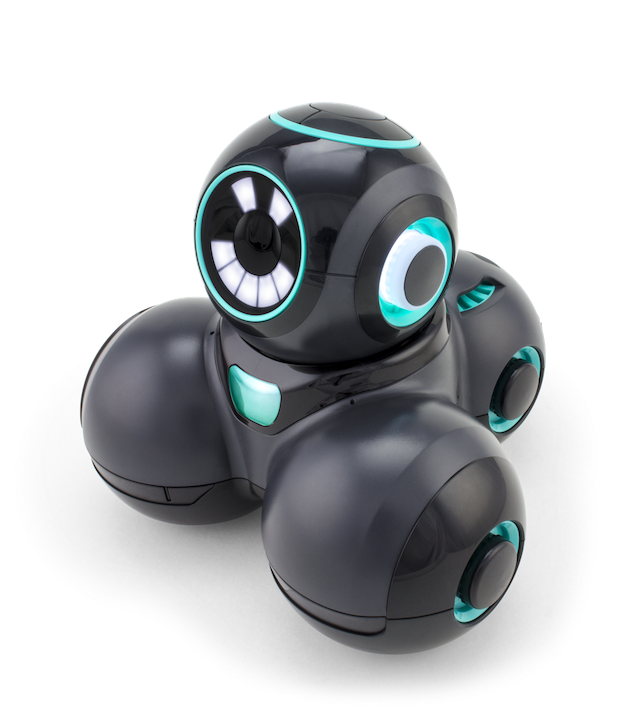
Cue Onyx

Wonder Workshop is an education and robotics startup based in Silicon Valley in the United States. Formerly called Play-i, Wonder Workshop ran a crowdfunding campaign in November 2013, where they introduced the robots Bo and Yana. They were subsequently renamed Dash and Dot before their launch in 2014. The company has currently raised $15.9 million in funding from Madrona Venture Group, CRV, WI Harper, Google Ventures, and others.

== Products ==
Wonder Workshop introduced Dash and Dot in December 2014. They are robots targeted at teaching creative problem-solving and computational thinking. They came with four free apps compatible with iOS and Android devices. Dash and Dot shipped to 37 countries including the U.S., Canada, Australia, New Zealand, European countries, India, Japan, Taiwan, Singapore and Hong Kong.

In 2017, Wonder Workshop launched a new robot for ages 11 and older named Cue. Cue is similar to Dash in its shape and size and comes in different colors. The robot became first available on September 28, 2017.

== Awards ==
- 2015 National Parenting Publications Award - Gold Winner
- Opening Minds USA Innovation Award
