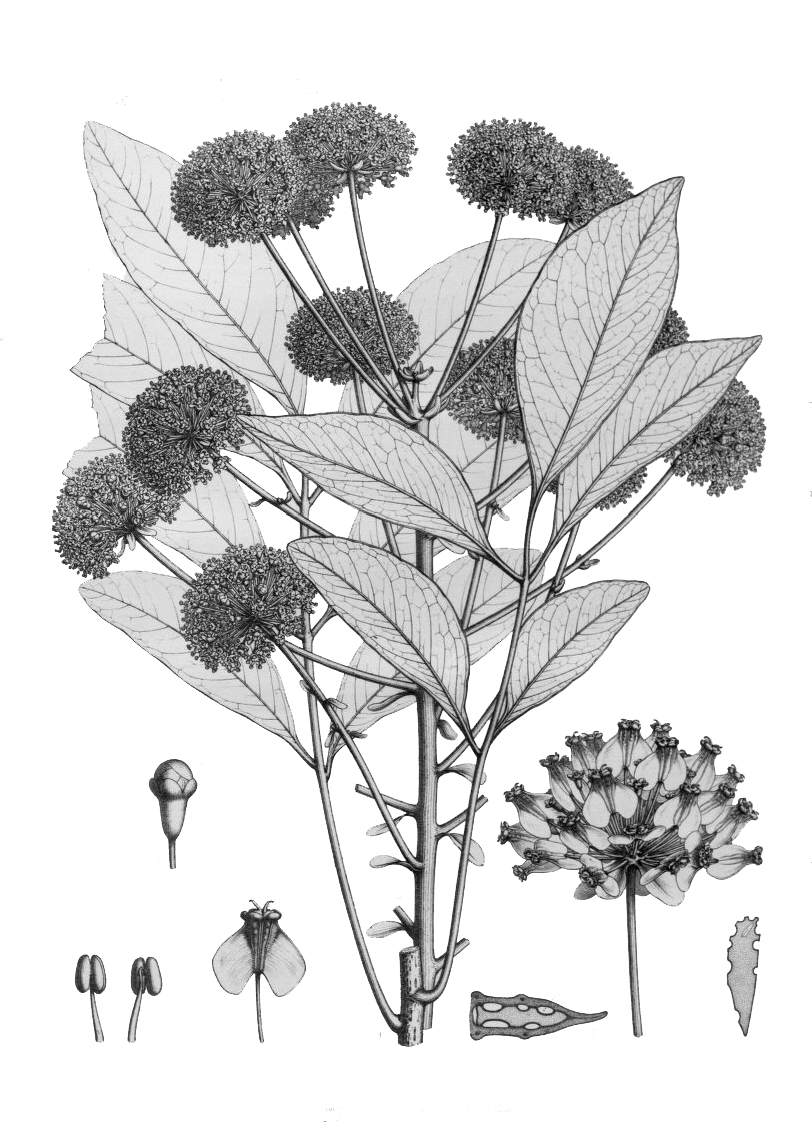
- Myodocarpus pinnatus

Scientific classification
- Kingdom: Plantae
- Clade: Tracheophytes
- Clade: Angiosperms
- Clade: Eudicots
- Clade: Asterids
- Order: Apiales
- Family: Myodocarpaceae; Doweld

Genera
- Delarbrea; Myodocarpus

= Myodocarpaceae =

Family of flowering plants

Myodocarpaceae is a family of flowering plants which contains 2 genera (Delarbrea, Myodocarpus) and 15 species. The family is accepted under the APG IV system and placed in the order Apiales. In earlier systems the two genera were included among the Araliaceae.

The center of diversity of the family is New Caledonia, where 13 of the 15 included species are endemic. Of the remaining two species, Delarbrea paradoxa subsp. paradoxa is found in the Lesser Sunda Islands, Maluku Islands, New Guinea, the Solomon Islands (archipelago) and Vanuatu as well as New Caledonia, while Delarbrea michieana is endemic to Australia. Plants in the family are small trees which either have a single trunk or are lightly branched.
