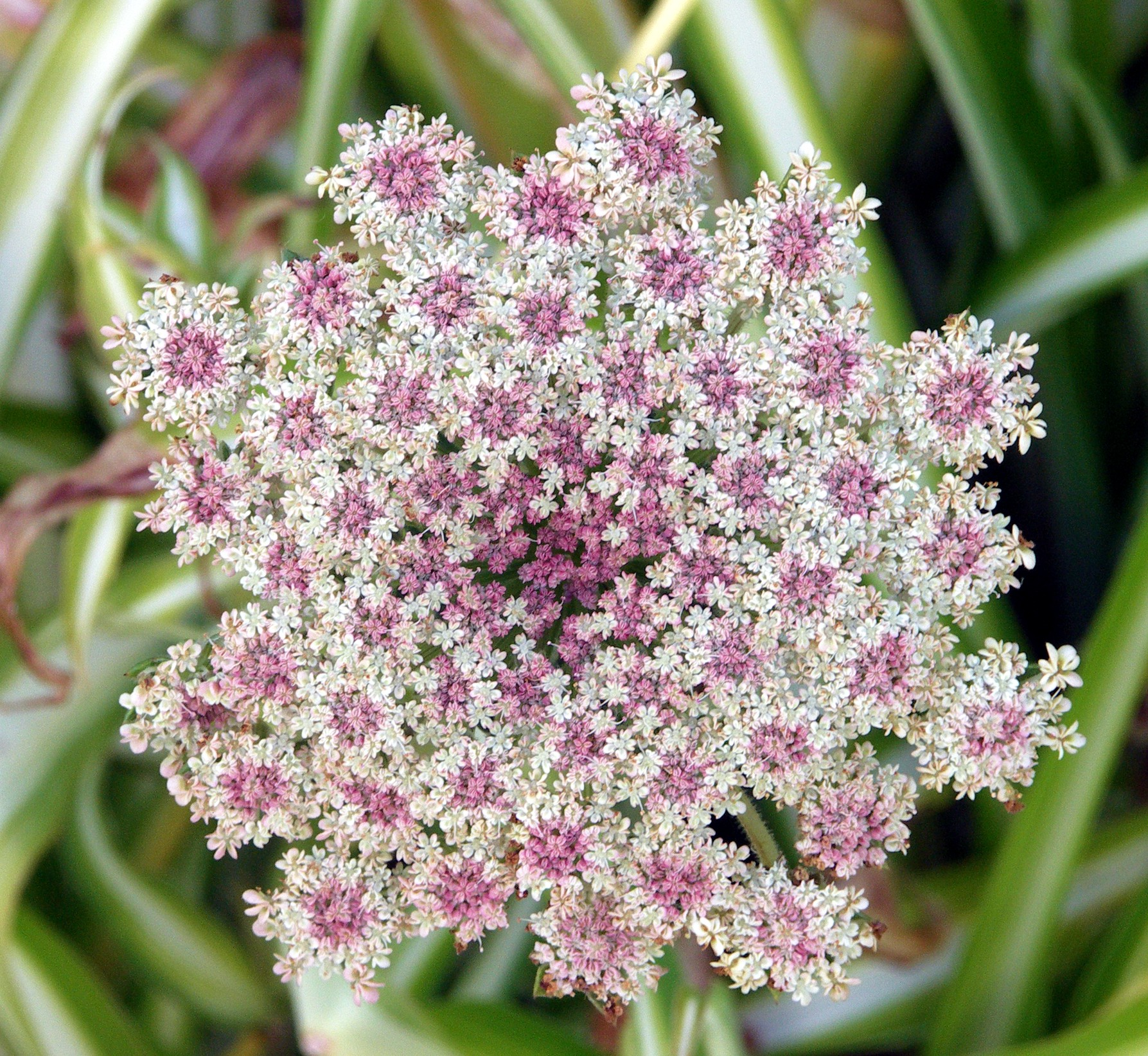
- Inflorescence of a wild carrot, Daucus carota, in the family Apiaceae.

Scientific classification
- Kingdom: Plantae
- Clade: Tracheophytes
- Clade: Angiosperms
- Clade: Eudicots
- Clade: Asterids
- Clade: Campanulids
- Order: Apiales; Nakai

Families
- Apiaceae (carrot family); Araliaceae (ginseng family); Griseliniaceae; Myodocarpaceae; Pennantiaceae; Pittosporaceae; Torricelliaceae

= Apiales =

Order of eudicot flowering plants in the asterid group

The Apiales are an order of flowering plants, included in the asterid group of dicotyledons. Well-known members of Apiales include carrots, celery, coriander, parsley, parsnips, poison hemlock, ginseng, ivies, and pittosporums.

Apiales consist of seven families, with the type family being the celery, carrot or parsley family, Apiaceae.

== Taxonomy ==
There are seven accepted families within the Apiales, though there is some slight variation and in particular, the Torriceliaceae may also be divided.

- Apiaceae (carrot family)
- Araliaceae (ginseng family)
- Griseliniaceae
- Myodocarpaceae
- Pennantiaceae
- Pittosporaceae
- Torricelliaceae

The present understanding of the Apiales is fairly recent and is based upon comparison of DNA sequences by phylogenetic methods. The circumscriptions of some of the families have changed. In 2009, one of the subfamilies of Araliaceae was shown to be polyphyletic.

The order Apiales is placed within the asterid group of eudicots as circumscribed by the APG III system. Within the asterids, Apiales belongs to an unranked group called the campanulids, and within the campanulids, it belongs to a clade known in phylogenetic nomenclature as Apiidae. In 2010, a subclade of Apiidae named Dipsapiidae was defined to consist of the three orders: Apiales, Paracryphiales, and Dipsacales.

Under the Cronquist system, only the Apiaceae and Araliaceae were included here, and the restricted order was placed among the rosids rather than the asterids. The Pittosporaceae were placed within the Rosales, and many of the other forms within the family Cornaceae. Pennantia was in the family Icacinaceae. In the classification system of Dahlgren the families Apiaceae and Araliaceae were placed in the order Ariales, in the superorder Araliiflorae (also called Aralianae).

== Gynoecia ==
The largest and obviously closely related families of Apiales are Araliaceae, Myodocarpaceae and Apiaceae, which resemble each other in the structure of their gynoecia. In this respect however, the Pittosporaceae is notably distinct from them.

Typical syncarpous gynoecia exhibit four vertical zones, determined by the extent of fusion of the carpels. In most plants, the synascidiate (i.e. "united bottle-shaped") and symplicate zones are fertile and bear the ovules. Each of the first three families possess mainly bi- or multilocular ovaries in a gynoecium with a long synascidiate, but very short symplicate zone, where the ovules are inserted at their transition, the so-called cross-zone (or "Querzone").

In gynoecia of the Pittosporaceae, the symplicate is much longer than the synascidiate zone, and the ovules are arranged along the first. Members of the latter family consequently have unilocular ovaries with a single cavity between adjacent carpels.
