= IME =

IME or ime may refer to:

== Organizations ==
- Institution of Mechanical Engineers, British engineering society
- Instituto Militar de Engenharia (Military Institute of Engineering), Rio de Janeiro, Brazil
- Instituto de los Mexicanos en el Exterior, Mexican government institute
- Iran Mercantile Exchange

== Science and technology ==
- Input method editor, allowing the entry of characters not physically present on a computer keyboard
- In-Movie Experience, to view bonus content on HD-DVD and Blu-ray Disc
- Intel Management Engine, for Intel Active Management Technology
- Intron-mediated enhancement, a biological process

=== Medicine ===
- Independent medical examination, by a health professional not involved in a patient's treatment
- Indirect Medical Education, a type of Medicare payment issued to teaching hospitals

== People ==
- Ime Akpan (born 1972), retired female track and field athlete from Nigeria
- Ime Udoka (born 1977), Nigerian-American basketball coach and former player
- Ime Bishop Umoh, Nigerian actor and comedian

== Places ==
- Ime, a village in Norway

== Entertainment ==
- I Me or iMe, a multinational girl group from China and Thailand
- I Mother Earth, a Canadian alternative rock band

== See also ==
- I Am Me (disambiguation)
- Imes (disambiguation)
