= Imes =

Imes or IMES may refer to:

== People ==
- Birney Imes (b. 1951), American photographer
- Brad Imes (b. 1977), American martial artist
- Elmer Imes (1883–1941), American physicist
- Kenny Imes (b. 1947), American politician
- Mo'Nique Imes (b. 1967), American comedian and actress

== Places ==
- Imes Bridge, a wooden covered bridge in Madison County, Iowa
- Imes, Kansas, a community in the United States

== Organizations ==
- Institute for Medical Engineering and Science, part of the Massachusetts Institute of Technology.
- Instituto Municipal de Ensino Superior de São Caetano do Sul, former name of a Brazilian university
- Irish Marine Emergency Service, former name of the Irish Coast Guard

== Other ==
- IMes, an organic compound that is a common ligand in organometallic chemistry
- Implantable myoelectric sensors, implanted sensors measuring muscle movement

== See also ==
- IME (disambiguation), some meanings have plural "Imes"
