= Prosthesis =

Artificial device that replaces a missing body part

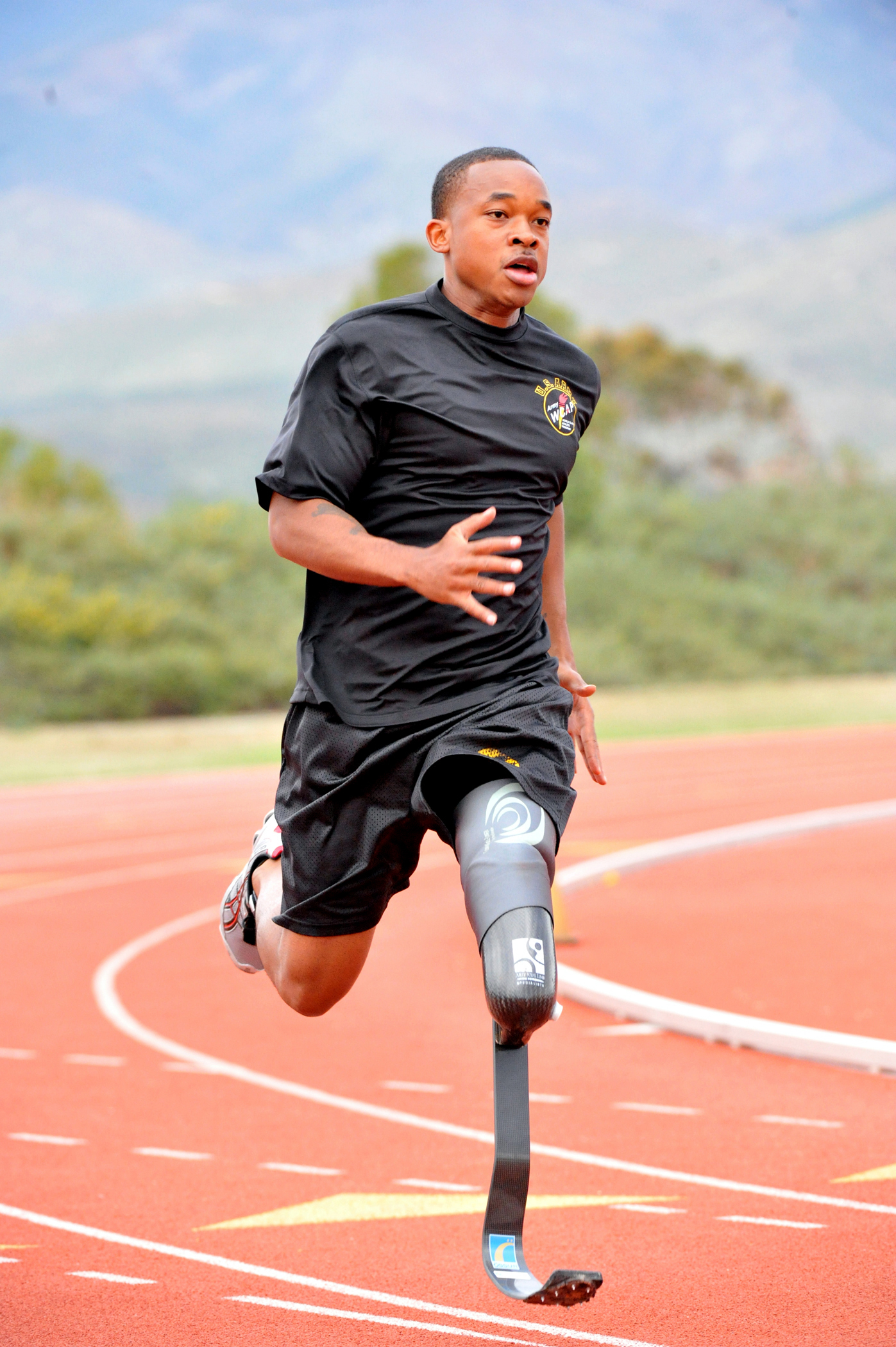
A person with a running prosthesis

In medicine, a prosthesis (pl.: prostheses; from Ancient Greek: πρόσθεσις, romanized: prósthesis, lit. 'addition, application, attachment'), or a prosthetic implant, is an artificial device that replaces a missing body part, which may be lost through physical trauma, disease, or a condition present at birth (congenital disorder). Prostheses may restore the normal functions of the missing body part, or may perform a cosmetic function.

A person who has undergone an amputation is sometimes referred to as an amputee. Rehabilitation for someone with an amputation is primarily coordinated by a physiatrist as part of an inter-disciplinary team consisting of physiatrists, prosthetists, nurses, physical therapists, and occupational therapists. Prostheses can be created by hand or with computer-aided design (CAD), a software interface that helps creators design and analyze the creation with computer-generated 2-D and 3-D graphics as well as analysis and optimization tools.

== Types ==
A person's prosthetic device should be designed and assembled to meet their individual appearance and functional needs. Depending on personal circumstances, co-morbidities, budget or health insurance coverage, and access to medical care, decisions may need to balance aesthetics and function. In addition, for some individuals, a myoelectric device, a body-powered device, or an activity-specific device may be appropriate options. The person's future goals and vocational aspirations and potential capabilities may help them choose between one or more devices.

Craniofacial prostheses include intra-oral and extra-oral prostheses. Extra-oral prostheses are further divided into hemifacial, auricular (ear), nasal, orbital and ocular. Intra-oral prostheses include dental prostheses, such as dentures, obturators, and dental implants.

Prostheses of the neck include larynx substitutes, trachea and upper esophageal replacements,

Some prostheses of the torso include breast prostheses which may be either single or bilateral, full breast devices or nipple prostheses.

Penile prostheses are used to treat erectile dysfunction, perform phalloplasty procedures in men, and to build a new penis in female-to-male gender reassignment surgeries.

=== Limb prostheses ===
Limb prostheses include both upper- and lower-extremity prostheses.

Upper-extremity prostheses are used at varying levels of amputation: forequarter, shoulder disarticulation, transhumeral prosthesis, elbow disarticulation, transradial prosthesis, wrist disarticulation, full hand, partial hand, finger, partial finger. A transradial prosthesis is an artificial limb that replaces an arm missing below the elbow.

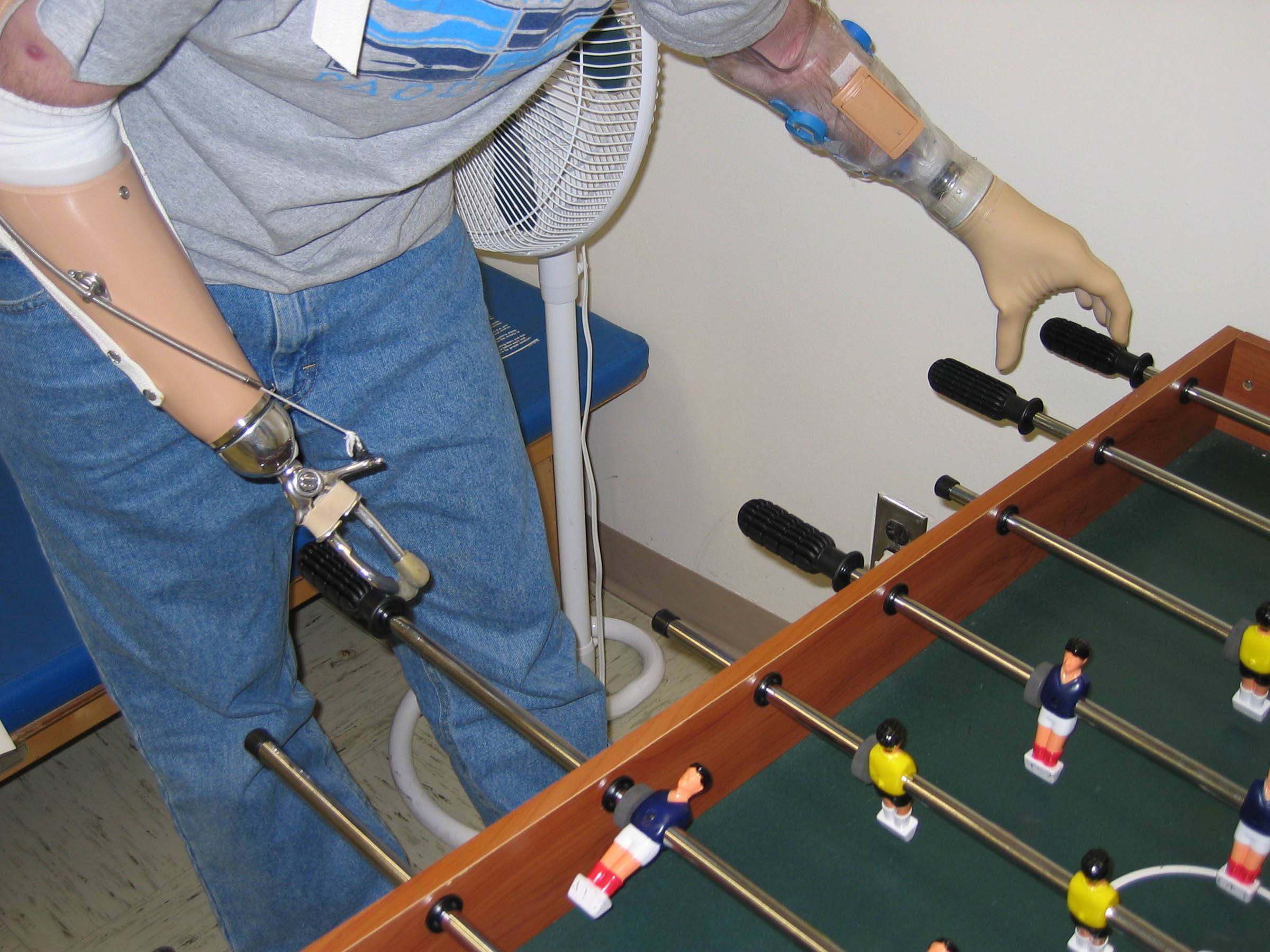
An example of two upper-extremity prosthetics, one body-powered (right arm), and another myoelectric (left arm)

Upper limb prostheses can be categorized in three main categories: passive devices, body-powered devices, and externally-powered (myoelectric) devices. Passive devices can either be passive hands, mainly used for cosmetic purposes, or passive tools, mainly used for specific activities (e.g. leisure or vocational). An extensive overview and classification of passive devices can be found in a literature review by Maat et.al. A passive device can be static, meaning the device has no movable parts, or it can be adjustable, meaning its configuration can be adjusted (e.g. adjustable hand opening). Despite the absence of active grasping, passive devices such as hooks are very useful in bimanual tasks that require fixation or support of an object, or for gesticulation in social interaction. An estimated third of upper limb amputees worldwide use a passive prosthetic hand.

Body-powered or cable-operated limbs work by attaching a harness and cable around the contralateral shoulder of the affected limb. A recent body-powered approach has explored the utilization of the user's breathing to power and control the prosthetic hand to help eliminate actuation cable and harness.

The third category of available prosthetic devices comprises myoelectric arms. This particular class of devices distinguishes itself from the previous ones due to the inclusion of a battery system. This battery serves the dual purpose of providing energy for both actuation and sensing components. While actuation predominantly relies on motor or pneumatic systems, a variety of solutions have been explored for capturing muscle activity, including techniques such as electromyography, sonomyography, myokinetics, and others. These methods function by detecting the minute electrical currents generated by contracted muscles during upper arm movement, typically employing electrodes or other suitable tools. Subsequently, these acquired signals are converted into gripping patterns or postures that the artificial hand will then execute.

In the prosthetics industry, a transradial prosthetic arm is often referred to as a "BE" or below-elbow prosthesis.

Lower-extremity prostheses provide replacements at varying levels of amputation. These include hip disarticulation, transfemoral prosthesis, knee disarticulation, transtibial prosthesis, Syme's amputation, foot, partial foot, and toe. The two main subcategories of lower extremity prosthetic devices are transtibial (any amputation transecting the tibia bone or a congenital anomaly resulting in a tibial deficiency) and transfemoral (any amputation transecting the femur bone or a congenital anomaly resulting in a femoral deficiency).

A transfemoral prosthesis is an artificial limb that replaces a leg missing above the knee. Transfemoral amputees can have a very difficult time regaining normal movement. In general, a transfemoral amputee must use approximately 80% more energy to walk than a person with two whole legs. This is due to the complexities in movement associated with the knee. In newer and more improved designs, hydraulics, carbon fiber, mechanical linkages, motors, computer microprocessors, and innovative combinations of these technologies are employed to give more control to the user. In the prosthetics industry, a transfemoral prosthetic leg is often referred to as an "AK" or above-the-knee prosthesis.

A transtibial prosthesis is an artificial limb that replaces a leg missing below the knee. A transtibial amputee is usually able to regain normal movement more readily than someone with a transfemoral amputation, due in large part to retaining the knee, which allows for easier movement. Lower extremity prosthetics describe artificially replaced limbs located at the hip level or lower. In the prosthetics industry, a transtibial prosthetic leg is often referred to as a "BK" or below-the-knee prosthesis.

Prostheses are manufactured and fit by clinical prosthetists. Prosthetists are healthcare professionals responsible for making, fitting, and adjusting prostheses; for lower limb prostheses, they also assess both gait and prosthetic alignment. Once a prosthesis has been fit and adjusted by a prosthetist, a rehabilitation physiotherapist (called physical therapist in America) will help teach a new prosthetic user to walk with a leg prosthesis. To do so, the physical therapist may provide verbal instructions and may also help guide the person using touch or tactile cues. This may be done in a clinic or home. There is some research suggesting that such training in the home may be more successful if the treatment includes the use of a treadmill. Using a treadmill, along with the physical therapy treatment, helps the person to experience many of the challenges of walking with a prosthesis.

In the United Kingdom, 75% of lower limb amputations are performed due to inadequate circulation (dysvascularity). This condition is often associated with many other medical conditions (co-morbidities) including diabetes and heart disease that may make it a challenge to recover and use a prosthetic limb to regain mobility and independence. For people who have inadequate circulation and have lost a lower limb, due to a lack of research, there is insufficient evidence that may inform them regarding their choice of prosthetic rehabilitation approaches.

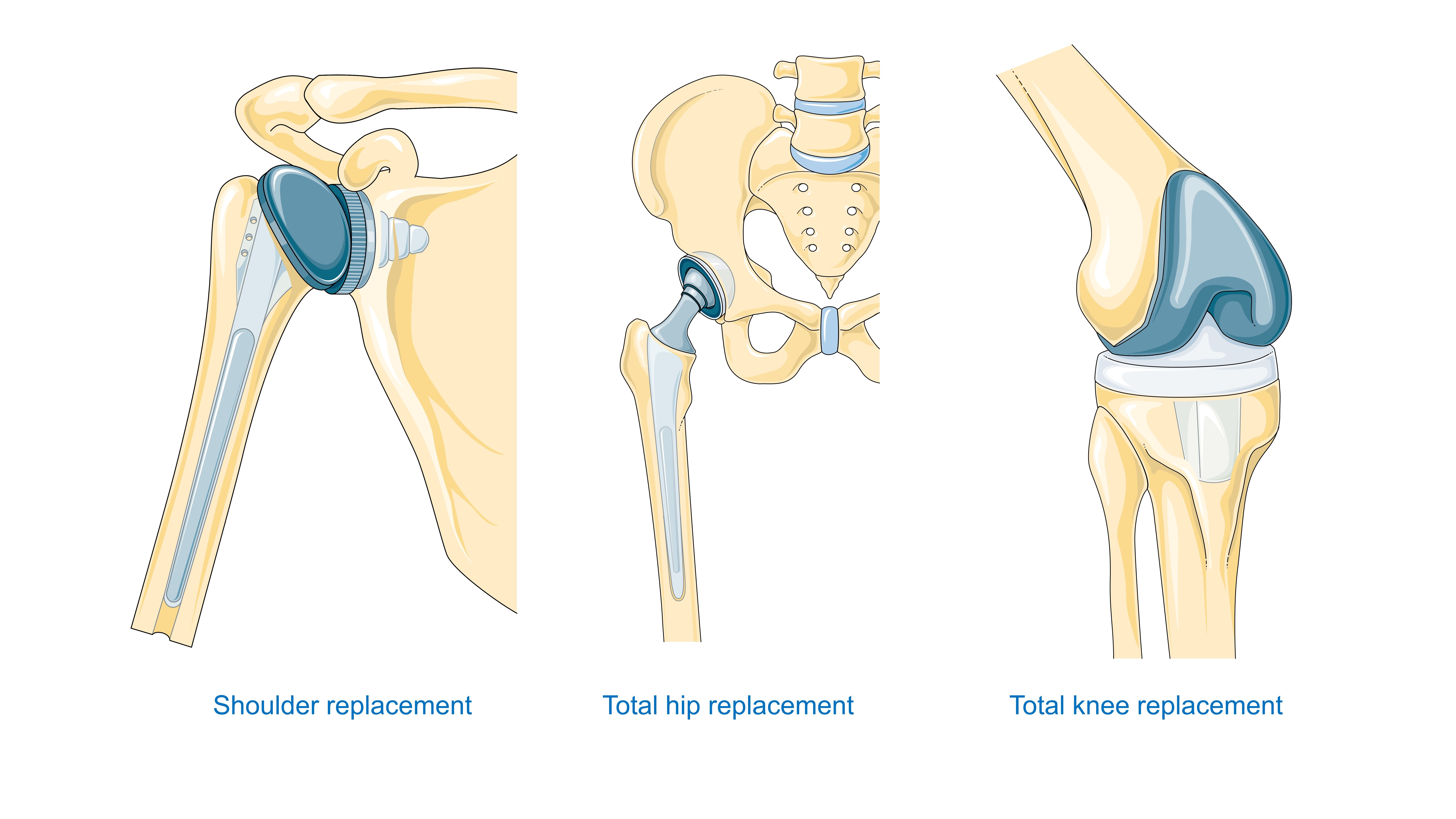
Types of prosthesis used for replacing joints in the human body

Lower-extremity prostheses are often categorized by the level of amputation or after the name of a surgeon:

- Transfemoral (above-knee)
- Transtibial (below-knee)
- Ankle disarticulation (more commonly known as Syme's amputation)
- Knee disarticulation (also see knee replacement)
- Hip disarticulation, (also see hip replacement)
- Hemi-pelvictomy
- Partial foot amputations (Pirogoff, Talo-Navicular and Calcaneo-cuboid (Chopart), Tarso-metatarsal (Lisfranc), Trans-metatarsal, Metatarsal-phalangeal, Ray amputations, toe amputations).
- Van Nes rotation (more commonly known as a rotationplasty)

==== Prosthetic raw materials ====
Prosthetic are made lightweight for better convenience for the amputee. Some of these materials include:

- Plastics:
  - Polyethylene
  - Polypropylene
  - Acrylics
  - Polyurethane
- Wood (early prosthetics)
- Rubber (early prosthetics)
- Lightweight metals:
  - Aluminum
- Composites:
  - Carbon fiber reinforced polymers

Wheeled prostheses have also been used extensively in the rehabilitation of injured domestic animals, including dogs, cats, pigs, rabbits, and turtles.

=== Organ prostheses ===
Organ prostheses include artificial hearts and artificial kidneys.

== History ==
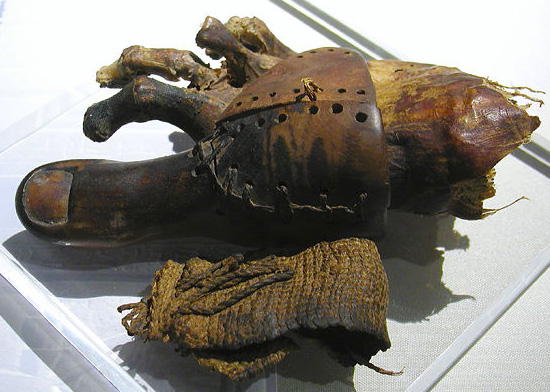
Prosthetic toe from ancient Egypt, dated between 950-710 BCE.

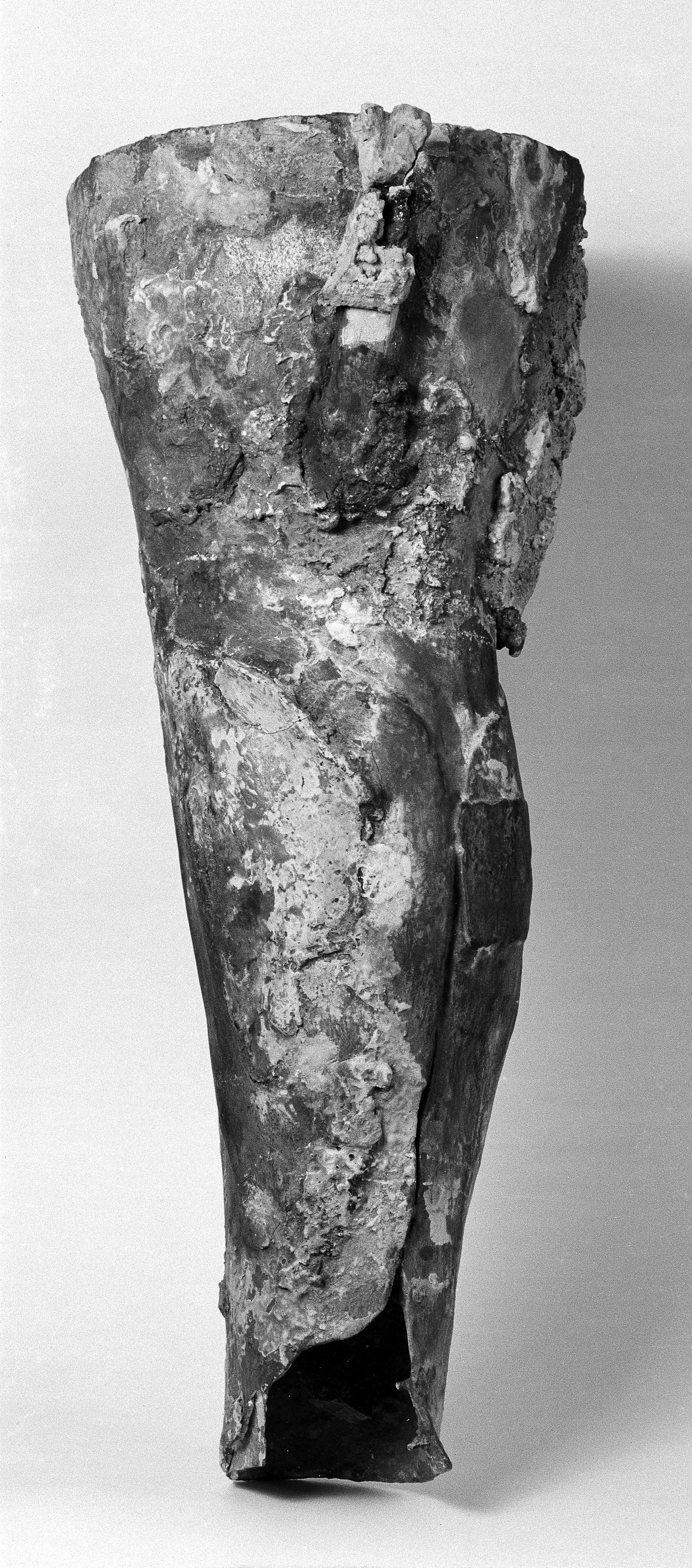
The Capua leg (replica)

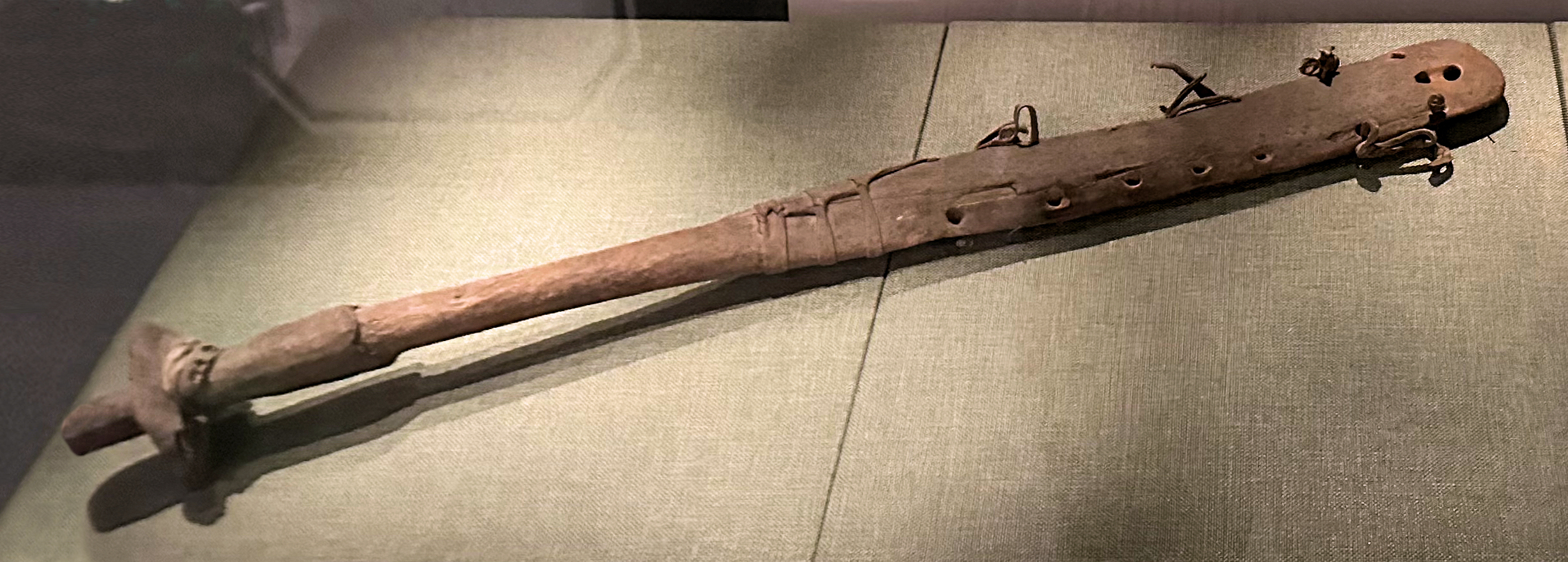
A wooden prosthetic leg from Shengjindian cemetery, circa 300 BCE, Turpan Museum. This is "the oldest functional leg prosthesis known to date".

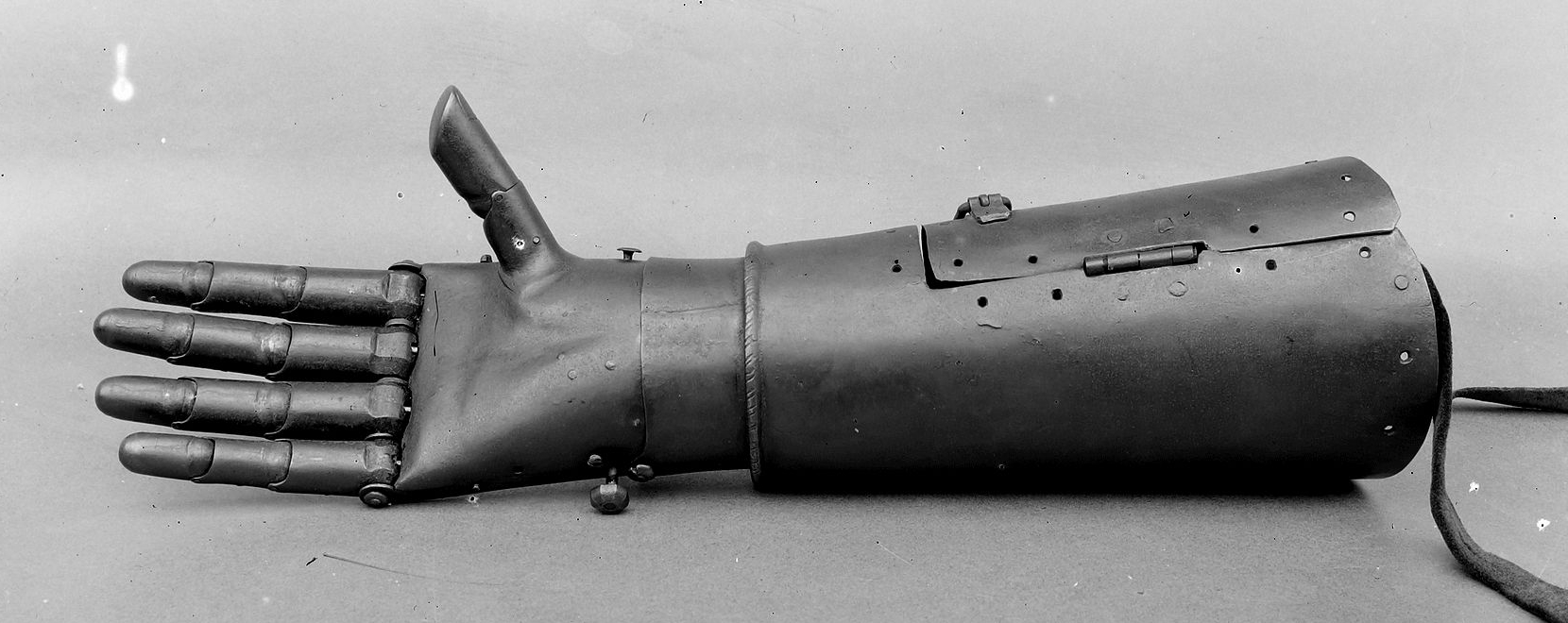
Iron prosthetic hand believed to have been owned by Götz von Berlichingen (1480–1562)

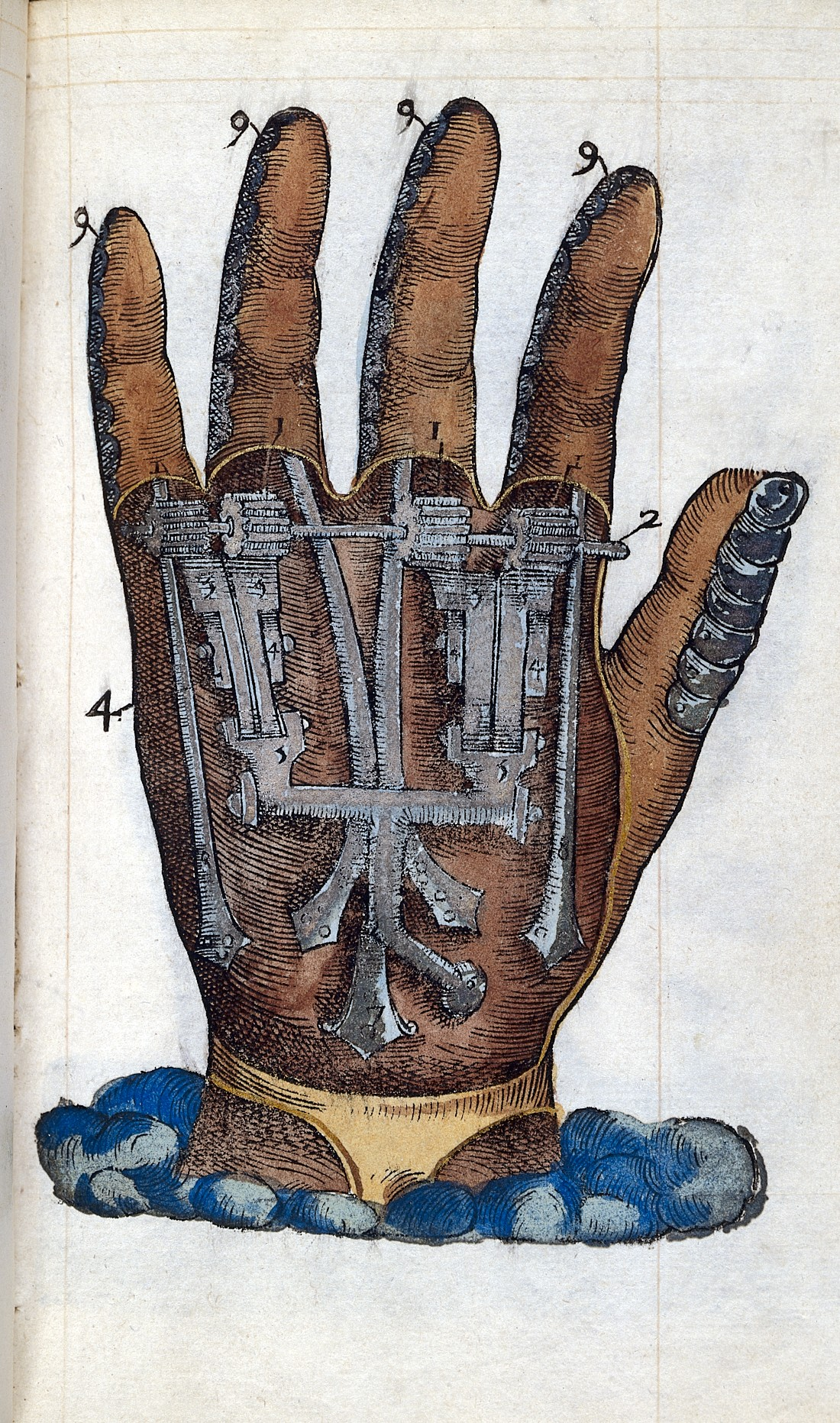
"Illustration of mechanical hand", c. 1564

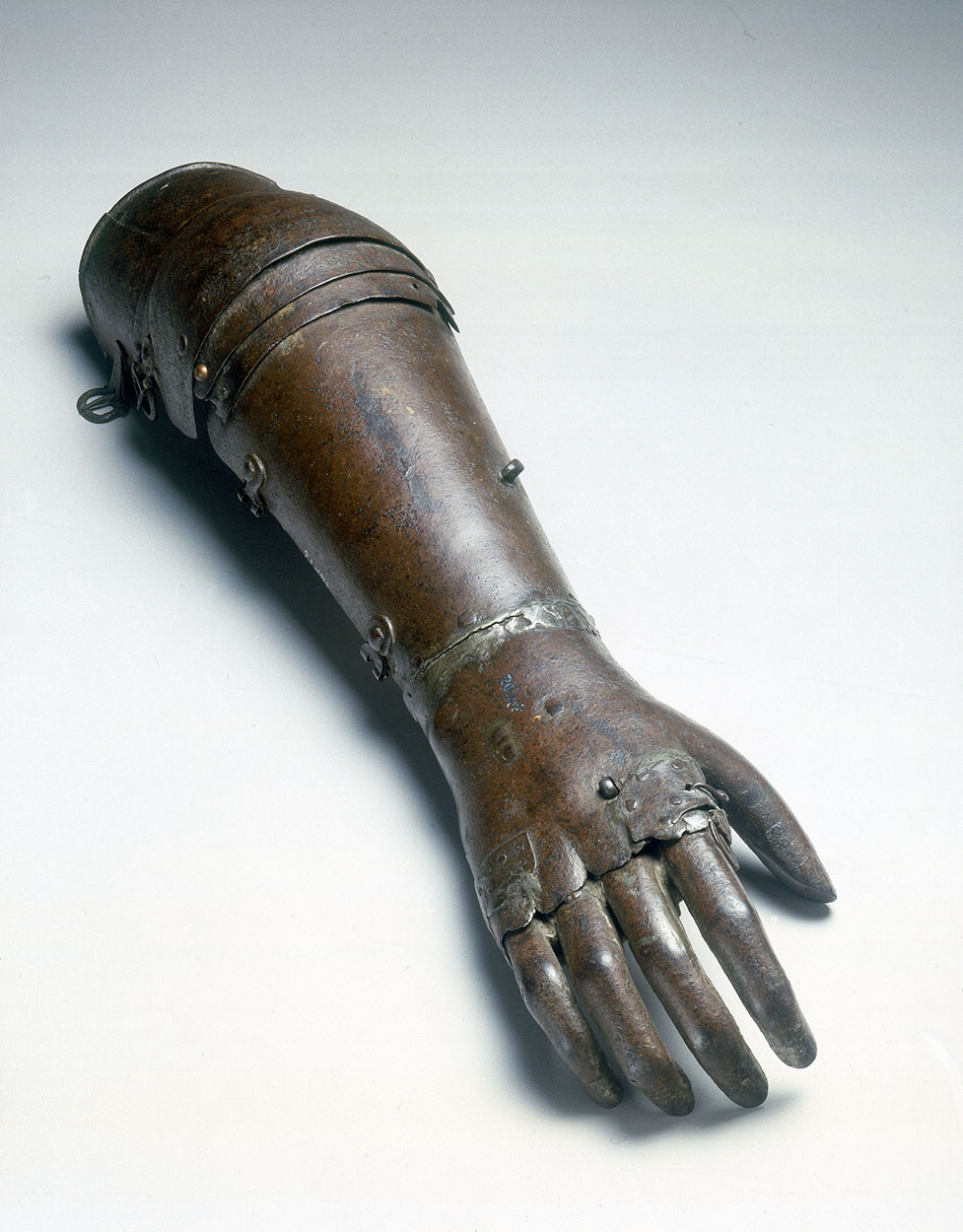
Artificial iron hand believed to date from 1560 to 1600

Prostheses originate from the ancient Near East circa 3000 BCE, with the earliest evidence of prostheses appearing in ancient Egypt and Iran. The earliest recorded mention of eye prostheses is from the Egyptian story of the Eye of Horus dated circa 3000 BC, which involves the left eye of Horus being plucked out and then restored by Thoth. Circa 3000-2800 BC, the earliest archaeological evidence of prosthetics is found in ancient Iran, where an eye prosthesis is found buried with a woman in Shahr-i Shōkhta. It was likely made of bitumen paste that was covered with a thin layer of gold. The Egyptians were also early pioneers of foot prostheses, as shown by the wooden toe found on a body from the New Kingdom circa 1000 BC. Another early textual mention is found in South Asia circa 1200 BC, involving the warrior queen Vishpala in the Rigveda. Roman bronze crowns have also been found, but their use could have been more aesthetic than medical.

An early mention of a prosthesis comes from the Greek historian Herodotus, who tells the story of Hegesistratus, a Greek diviner who cut off his own foot to escape his Spartan captors and replaced it with a wooden one.

Pliny the Elder also recorded the tale of a Roman general, Marcus Sergius, whose right hand was cut off while campaigning and had an iron hand made to hold his shield so that he could return to battle. A famous and quite refined historical prosthetic arm was that of Götz von Berlichingen, made at the beginning of the 16th century. The first confirmed use of a prosthetic device, however, is from 950 to 710 BC. In 2000, research pathologists discovered a mummy from this period buried in the Egyptian necropolis near ancient Thebes that possessed an artificial big toe. This toe, consisting of wood and leather, exhibited evidence of use. When reproduced by bio-mechanical engineers in 2011, researchers discovered that this ancient prosthesis enabled its wearer to walk both barefoot and in Egyptian style sandals. Previously, the earliest discovered prosthesis was an artificial leg from Capua.

Around the same time, François de la Noue is also reported to have had an iron hand, as is, in the 17th century, René-Robert Cavalier de la Salle. Henri de Tonti had a prosthetic hook for a hand. During the Middle Ages, prostheses remained quite basic in form. Debilitated knights would be fitted with prostheses so they could hold up a shield, grasp a lance or a sword, or stabilize a mounted warrior. Only the wealthy could afford anything that would assist in daily life.

One notable prosthesis was that belonging to an Italian man, who scientists estimate replaced his amputated right hand with a knife. Scientists investigating the skeleton, which was found in a Longobard cemetery in Povegliano Veronese, estimated that the man had lived sometime between the 6th and 8th centuries AD. Materials found near the man's body suggest that the knife prosthesis was attached with a leather strap, which he repeatedly tightened with his teeth.

During the Renaissance, prosthetics developed with the use of iron, steel, copper, and wood. Functional prostheses began to make an appearance in the 1500s.

=== Technology progress before the 20th century ===
An Italian surgeon recorded the existence of an amputee who had an arm that allowed him to remove his hat, open his purse, and sign his name. Improvements in amputation surgery and prosthetic design came at the hands of Ambroise Paré, who is considered the father of modern prosthetics. Among his inventions was an above-knee device that was a kneeling peg leg and foot prosthesis with a fixed position, adjustable harness, and knee lock control. The functionality of his advancements showed how future prostheses could develop.

Other major improvements before the modern era:

- Pieter Verduyn – First non-locking below-knee (BK) prosthesis.
- James Potts – Prosthesis made of a wooden shank and socket, a steel knee joint and an articulated foot that was controlled by catgut tendons from the knee to the ankle. Came to be known as "Anglesey Leg" or "Selpho Leg".
- Sir James Syme – A new method of ankle amputation that did not involve amputating at the thigh.
- Benjamin Palmer – Improved upon the Selpho leg. Added an anterior spring and concealed tendons to simulate natural-looking movement.
- Dubois Parmlee – Created prosthesis with a suction socket, polycentric knee, and multi-articulated foot.
- Marcel Desoutter and Charles Desoutter – First aluminium prosthesis.
- Henry Heather Bigg, and his son Henry Robert Heather Bigg, won the Queen's command to provide "surgical appliances" to wounded soldiers after Crimea War. They developed arms that allowed a double arm amputee to crochet, and a hand that felt natural to others based on ivory, felt and leather.

=== 20th century ===
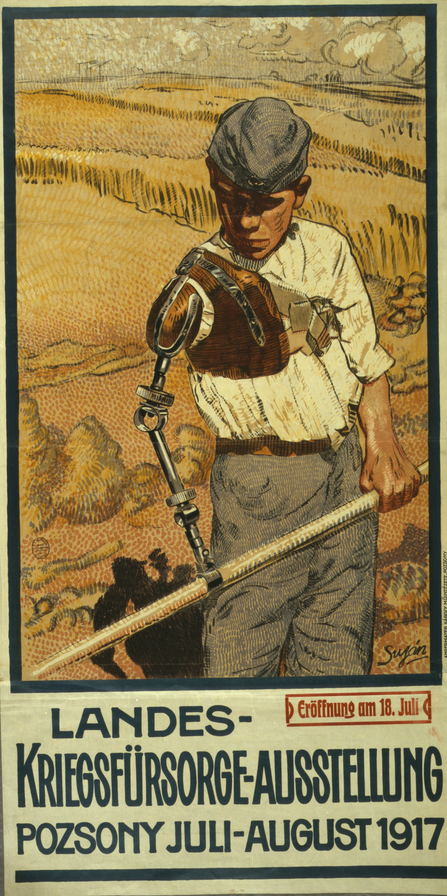
Austrian World War I propaganda poster for an exhibition on veteran support, depicting a wounded in action veteran with a prosthesis.

At the end of World War II, the NAS (National Academy of Sciences) began to advocate better research and development of prosthetics. Through government funding, a research and development program was developed within the Army, Navy, Air Force, and the Veterans Administration.

=== Lower extremity modern history ===
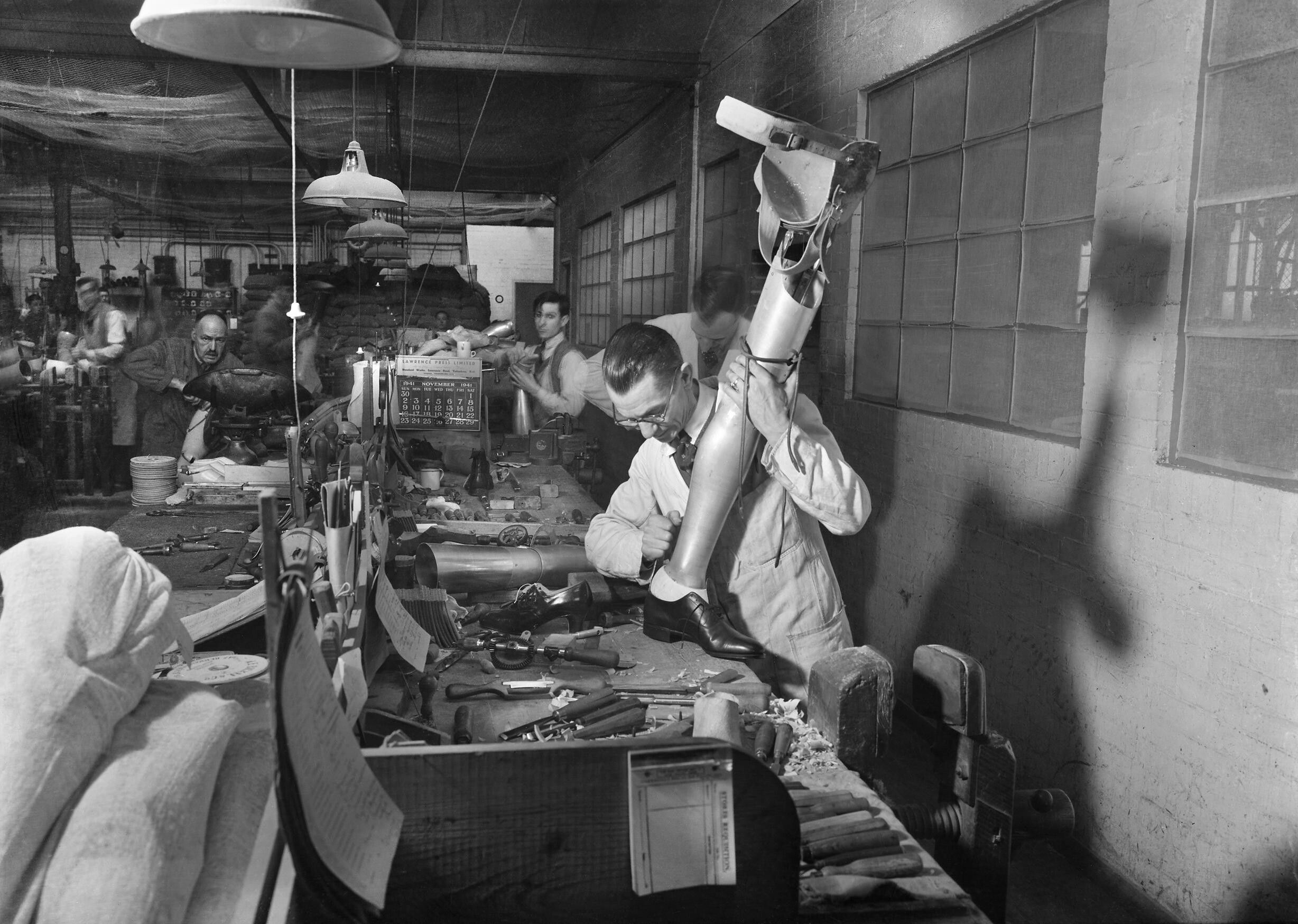
An artificial limbs factory in 1941

After the Second World War, a team at the University of California, Berkeley including James Foort and C.W. Radcliff helped to develop the quadrilateral socket by developing a jig fitting system for amputations above the knee. Socket technology for lower extremity limbs saw a further revolution during the 1980s when John Sabolich C.P.O., invented the Contoured Adducted Trochanteric-Controlled Alignment Method (CATCAM) socket, later to evolve into the Sabolich Socket. He followed the direction of Ivan Long and Ossur Christensen as they developed alternatives to the quadrilateral socket, which in turn followed the open ended plug socket, created from wood. The advancement was due to the difference in the socket to patient contact model. Prior to this, sockets were made in the shape of a square shape with no specialized containment for muscular tissue. New designs thus help to lock in the bony anatomy, locking it into place and distributing the weight evenly over the existing limb as well as the musculature of the patient. Ischial containment is well known and used today by many prosthetists to help in patient care. Variations of the ischial containment socket thus exists and each socket is tailored to the specific needs of the patient. Others who contributed to socket development and changes over the years include Tim Staats, Chris Hoyt, and Frank Gottschalk. Gottschalk disputed the efficacy of the CAT-CAM socket, insisting the surgical procedure done by the amputation surgeon was the most important factor preparing the amputee for good use of any type of prosthetic socket.

The first microprocessor-controlled prosthetic knees became available in the early 1990s. The Intelligent Prosthesis was the first commercially available microprocessor-controlled prosthetic knee. It was released by Chas. A. Blatchford & Sons, Ltd., of Great Britain, in 1993 and made walking with the prosthesis feel and look more natural. An improved version was released in 1995 by the name Intelligent Prosthesis Plus. Blatchford released another prosthesis, the Adaptive Prosthesis, in 1998. The Adaptive Prosthesis utilized hydraulic controls, pneumatic controls, and a microprocessor to provide the amputee with a gait that was more responsive to changes in walking speed. Cost analysis revealed that a sophisticated above-knee prosthesis would be about $1 million in 45 years, given only annual cost of living adjustments.

In 2019, a project under AT2030 was launched in which bespoke sockets are made using a thermoplastic, rather than through a plaster cast. These sockets, called Amparo Confidence sockets, are faster and significantly less expensive to manufacture.

=== Upper extremity modern history ===
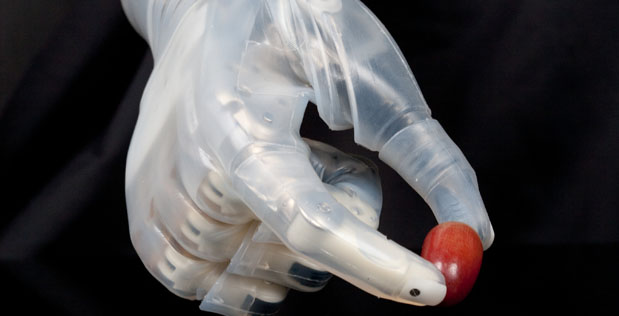
DARPA Revolutionizing Prosthetics - The LUKE Arm

In 2005, DARPA started the Revolutionizing Prosthetics program. According to DARPA, the goal of the $100 million program was to "develop an advanced electromechanical prosthetic upper limb with near-natural control that would dramatically enhance independence and quality of life for amputees." In 2014, the LUKE Arm developed by Dean Kamen and his team at DEKA Research and Development Corp. became the first prosthetic arm approved by FDA that "translates signals from a person's muscles to perform complex tasks," according to FDA. Johns Hopkins University and the U.S. Department of Veteran Affairs also participated in the program.

=== Design trends moving forward ===
As the prosthetics industry evolves, many newer design trends point to lighter, more durable, and flexible materials like carbon fiber, silicone, and advanced polymers. These not only make the prosthetic limb lighter and more durable but also allow it to mimic the look and feel of natural skin, providing users with a more comfortable and natural experience. This new technology helps prosthetic users blend in with people without limb differences, potentially reducing social stigmatization. Another trend points towards using bionics and myoelectric components in prosthetic design. These limbs utilize sensors to detect electrical signals from the user's residual muscles. The signals are then converted into mechanical motion, allowing users to control their prosthetic limbs using their own muscle contractions. This has greatly improved the range and fluidity of movements available to amputees, making tasks like grasping objects or walking naturally much more feasible. Integration with AI is also on the forefront of modern prosthetic design. AI-enabled prosthetic limbs can learn from and adapt to the user's habits and preferences over time, allowing for higher functionality and quality of life. By analyzing the user's gait, grip, and other movements, these smart limbs can make real-time adjustments, providing smoother and more natural motions.

== Patient procedure ==
A prosthesis is a functional replacement for an amputated or congenitally malformed or missing limb. Prosthetists are responsible for the prescription, design, and management of a prosthetic device.

In most cases, the prosthetist begins by taking a plaster cast of the patient's affected limb. Lightweight, high-strength thermoplastics are custom-formed to this model of the patient. Cutting-edge materials such as carbon fiber, titanium and Kevlar provide strength and durability while making the new prosthesis lighter. More sophisticated prostheses are equipped with advanced electronics, providing additional stability and control.

Computers are also used extensively in the manufacturing of limbs. Computer Aided Design and Computer Aided Manufacturing are often used to assist in the design and manufacture of artificial limbs.

== Current technology and manufacturing ==
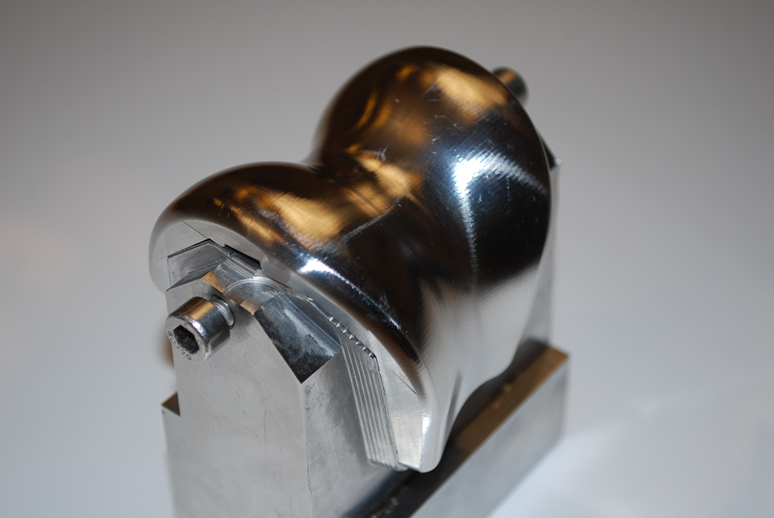
Knee prosthesis manufactured using WorkNC Computer Aided Manufacturing software

Over the years, there have been advancements in artificial limbs. New plastics and other materials, such as carbon fiber, have allowed artificial limbs to be stronger and lighter, limiting the amount of extra energy necessary to operate the limb. This is especially important for transfemoral amputees. Additional materials have allowed artificial limbs to look much more realistic, which is important to transradial and transhumeral amputees because they are more likely to have the artificial limb exposed.

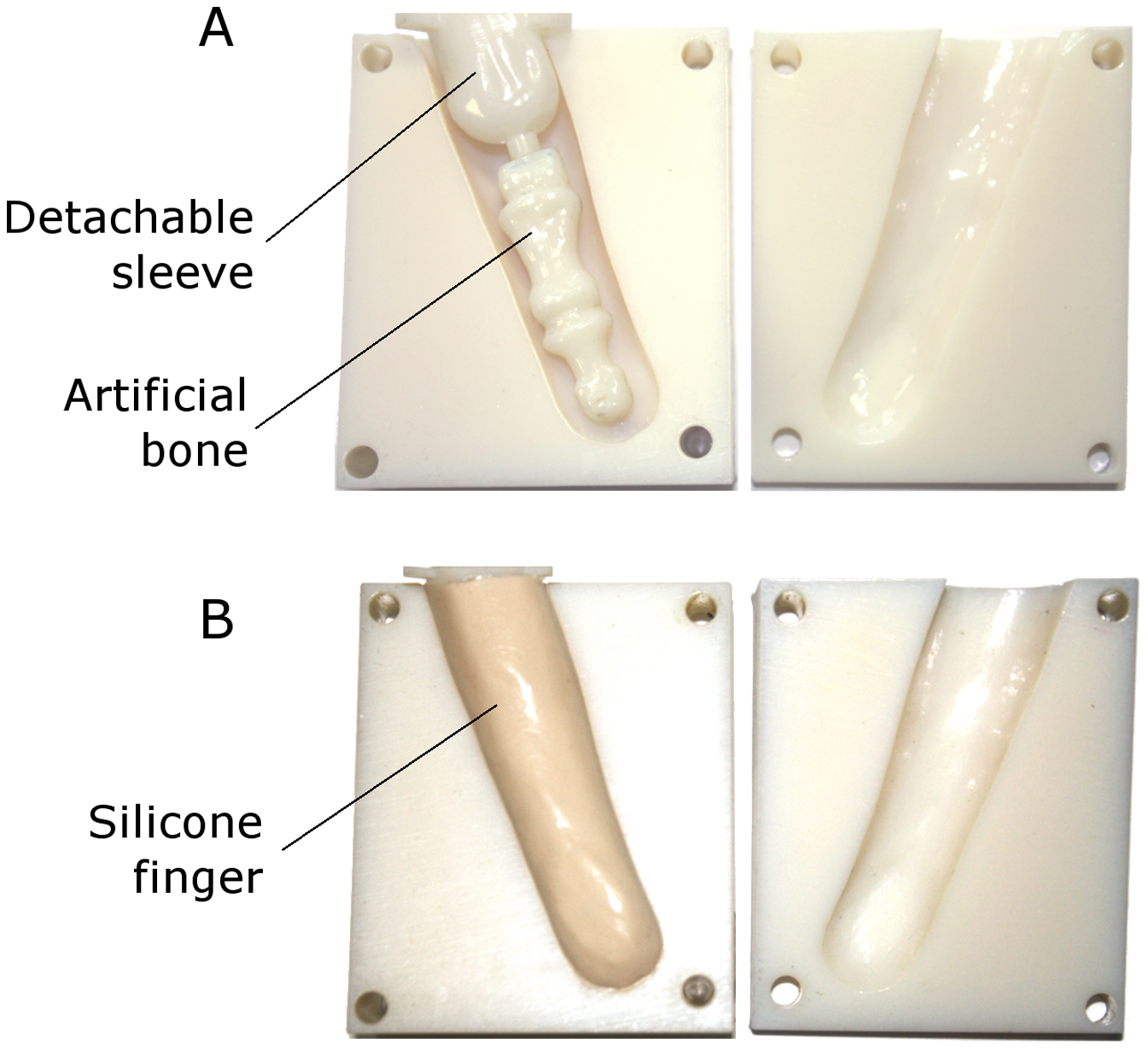
Manufacturing a prosthetic finger

In addition to new materials, the use of electronics has become very common in artificial limbs. Myoelectric limbs, which control the limbs by converting muscle movements to electrical signals, have become much more common than cable-operated limbs. Myoelectric signals are picked up by electrodes. The signal gets integrated and once it exceeds a certain threshold, the prosthetic limb control signal is triggered. As such, all myoelectric controls experience some degree of lag. Conversely, cable control is immediate and physical, which offers a certain degree of direct force feedback that myoelectric control does not.

Most modern artificial limbs are attached to the residual limb (stump) of the amputee by belts and cuffs or by suction. The residual limb either directly fits into a socket on the prosthetic, or—more commonly today—a liner, which is then fixed to the socket either by vacuum (suction sockets) or a pin lock. Because they are soft, liners can create a far better suction fit than hard sockets. Silicone liners are available in standardized sizes, mostly with a circular cross section, but for any other residual limb shape, prosthetists can create custom liners. The socket is custom-made to fit the residual limb and to distribute the forces of the artificial limb across the area of the residual limb, rather than on just one small spot, which helps reduce wear on the residual limb.

=== Production of prosthetic socket ===
The production of a prosthetic socket begins with capturing the geometry of the residual limb; this process is called shape capture. The goal of this process is to create an accurate representation of the residual limb, which is critical to achieve good socket fit. The custom socket is created by taking a plaster cast of the residual limb or, more commonly today, of the liner worn over their residual limb, and then making a mold from the plaster cast. The commonly used compound is called Plaster of Paris. In recent years, various digital shape capture systems have been developed which can be input directly to a computer allowing for a more sophisticated design. In general, the shape capturing process begins with the digital acquisition of three-dimensional (3D) geometric data from the amputee's residual limb. Data are acquired with either a probe, laser scanner, structured light scanner, or a photographic-based 3D scanning system.

After shape capture, the second phase of the socket production is called rectification, which is the process of modifying the model of the residual limb by adding volume to potential pressure points and removing volume from load bearing areas. This can be done manually by adding or removing plaster to the positive model, or virtually by manipulating the computerized model in software. Lastly, the fabrication of the prosthetic socket begins once the model has been rectified and finalized. Prosthetists wrap the positive model with a semi-molten plastic sheet or carbon fiber coated with epoxy resin to construct the prosthetic socket. Computerized models can be 3D printed using various materials ranging in flexibility and mechanical strength.

Optimal socket fit is critical to the function and usage of the entire prosthesis. If the fit between the residual limb and socket attachment is too loose, this will reduce the area of contact and increase pockets between the residual limb and socket or liner. Pressure is then higher, which can be painful. Air pockets can allow sweat to accumulate, which can soften the skin. Ultimately, this is a frequent cause for itchy skin rashes, and over time, can lead to breakdown of the skin. On the other hand, a very tight fit may excessively increase the interface pressures that may also lead to skin breakdown after prolonged use.

Artificial limbs are typically manufactured using the following steps:

1. Measurement of the residual limb
2. Measurement of the body to determine the size required for the artificial limb
3. Fitting of a silicone liner
4. Creation of a model of the liner worn over the residual limb
5. Formation of thermoplastic sheet around the model – this is then used to test the fit of the prosthetic
6. Formation of permanent socket
7. Formation of plastic parts of the artificial limb – different methods are used, including vacuum forming and injection molding
8. Creation of metal parts of the artificial limb using die casting
9. Assembly of the entire limb

=== Body-powered arms ===
Current technology allows body-powered arms to weigh around one-half to one-third of what a myoelectric arm does.

==== Sockets ====
Current body-powered arms contain sockets that are built from hard epoxy or carbon fiber. These sockets or "interfaces" can be made more comfortable by lining them with a softer, compressible foam material that provides padding for the bone prominences. A self-suspending or supra-condylar socket design is useful for those with short to mid-range below-elbow absence. Longer limbs may require the use of a locking roll-on type inner liner or more complex harnessing to help augment suspension.

==== Wrists ====
Wrist units are either screw-on connectors featuring the UNF 1/2-20 thread (USA) or quick-release connector, of which there are different models.

==== Voluntary opening and voluntary closing ====
Two types of body-powered systems exist, voluntary opening ("pull to open") and voluntary closing ("pull to close"). Virtually all "split hook" prostheses operate with a voluntary opening type system.

More modern "prehensors" called GRIPS utilize voluntary closing systems, which are significantly different to voluntary opening systems. Users of voluntary opening systems rely on elastic bands or springs for gripping force, while users of voluntary closing systems rely on their own body power and energy to create gripping force.

Voluntary closing users can generate prehension forces equivalent to the normal hand, up to or exceeding one hundred pounds. Voluntary closing GRIPS require constant tension to grip, like a human hand, and in that property, come closer to matching human hand performance. Voluntary opening split hook users are limited to forces their rubber or springs can generate which usually is below 20 pounds.

==== Feedback ====
An additional difference exists in the biofeedback created that allows the user to "feel" what is being held. Once engaged, voluntary opening systems provide the holding force so that they operate like a passive vice at the end of the arm. No gripping feedback is provided once the hook has closed around the object being held. Voluntary closing systems provide directly proportional control and biofeedback so that the user can feel how much force that they are applying.

In 1997, the Colombian Prof. Álvaro Ríos Poveda, a researcher in bionics in Latin America, developed an upper limb and hand prosthesis with sensory feedback. This technology allows amputee patients to handle prosthetic hand systems in a more natural way.

A recent study showed that by stimulating the median and ulnar nerves, according to the information provided by the artificial sensors from a hand prosthesis, physiologically appropriate (near-natural) sensory information could be provided to an amputee. This feedback enabled the participant to effectively modulate the grasping force of the prosthesis with no visual or auditory feedback.

In February 2013, researchers from École Polytechnique Fédérale de Lausanne in Switzerland and the Scuola Superiore Sant'Anna in Italy, implanted electrodes into an amputee's arm, which gave the patient sensory feedback and allowed for real time control of the prosthetic. With wires linked to nerves in his upper arm, the Danish patient was able to handle objects and instantly receive a sense of touch through the special artificial hand that was created by Silvestro Micera and researchers both in Switzerland and Italy.

In July 2019, this technology was expanded on even further by researchers from the University of Utah, led by Jacob George. The group of researchers implanted electrodes into the patient's arm to map out several sensory precepts. They would then stimulate each electrode to figure out how each sensory precept was triggered, then proceed to map the sensory information onto the prosthetic. This would allow the researchers to get a good approximation of the same kind of information that the patient would receive from their natural hand. Unfortunately, the arm is too expensive for the average user to acquire; however, George mentioned that insurance companies could cover the costs of the prosthetic.

==== Terminal devices ====
Terminal devices contain a range of hooks, prehensors, hands or other devices.

===== Hooks =====
Voluntary opening split hook systems are simple, convenient, light, robust, versatile and relatively affordable.

A hook does not match a normal human hand for appearance or overall versatility, but its material tolerances can exceed and surpass the normal human hand for mechanical stress (one can even use a hook to slice open boxes or as a hammer whereas the same is not possible with a normal hand), for thermal stability (one can use a hook to grip items from boiling water, to turn meat on a grill, to hold a match until it has burned down completely) and for chemical hazards (as a metal hook withstands acids or lye, and does not react to solvents like a prosthetic glove or human skin).

===== Hands =====
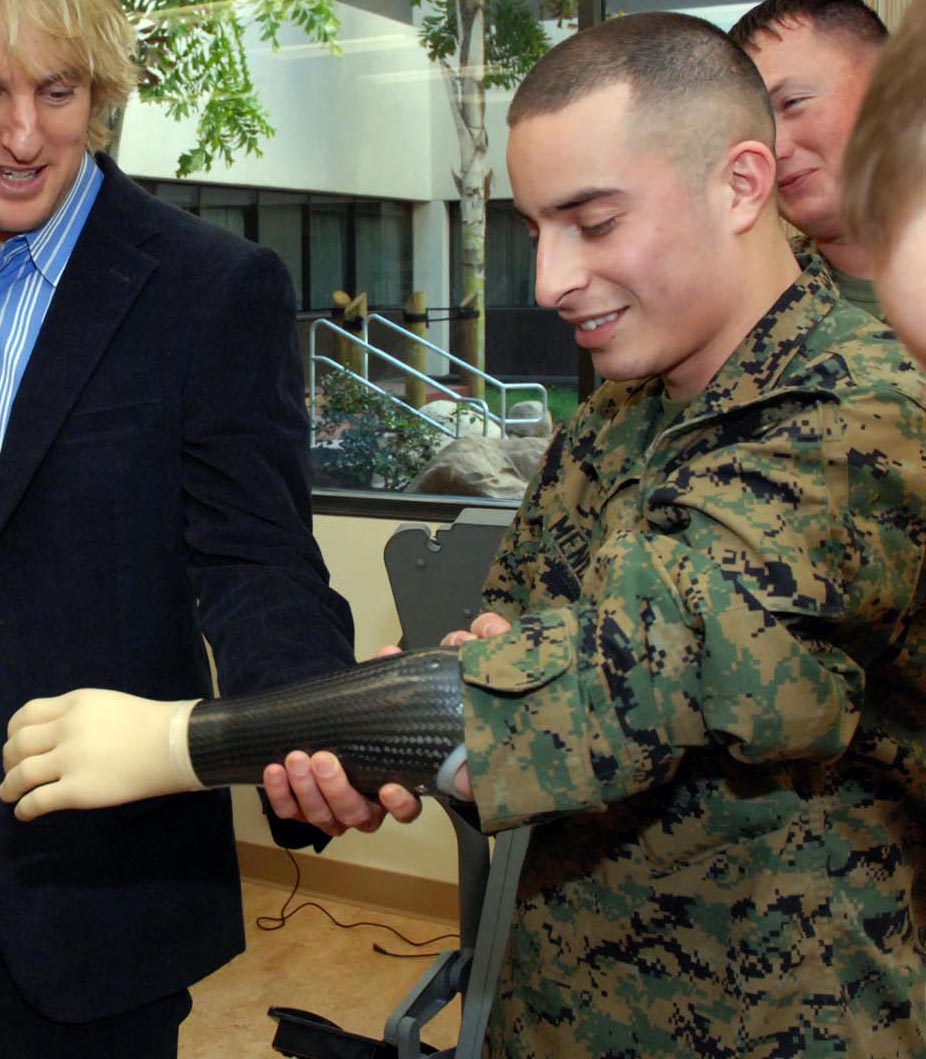
Actor Owen Wilson gripping the myoelectric prosthetic arm of a United States Marine

Prosthetic hands are available in both voluntary opening and voluntary closing versions and because of their more complex mechanics and cosmetic glove covering require a relatively large activation force, which, depending on the type of harness used, may be uncomfortable. A recent study by the Delft University of Technology, The Netherlands, showed that the development of mechanical prosthetic hands has been neglected during the past decades. The study showed that the pinch force level of most current mechanical hands is too low for practical use. The best tested hand was a prosthetic hand developed around 1945. In 2017 however, a research has been started with bionic hands by Laura Hruby of the Medical University of Vienna. A few open-hardware 3-D printable bionic hands have also become available. Some companies are also producing robotic hands with integrated forearm, for fitting unto a patient's upper arm and in 2020, at the Italian Institute of Technology (IIT), another robotic hand with integrated forearm (Soft Hand Pro) was developed.

==== Commercial providers and materials ====
Hosmer and Otto Bock are major commercial hook providers. Mechanical hands are sold by Hosmer and Otto Bock as well; the Becker Hand is still manufactured by the Becker family. Prosthetic hands may be fitted with standard stock or custom-made cosmetic looking silicone gloves. But regular work gloves may be worn as well. Other terminal devices include the V2P Prehensor, a versatile robust gripper that allows customers to modify aspects of it, Texas Assist Devices (with a whole assortment of tools) and TRS that offers a range of terminal devices for sports. Cable harnesses can be built using aircraft steel cables, ball hinges, and self-lubricating cable sheaths. Some prosthetics have been designed specifically for use in salt water.

=== Lower-extremity prosthetics ===
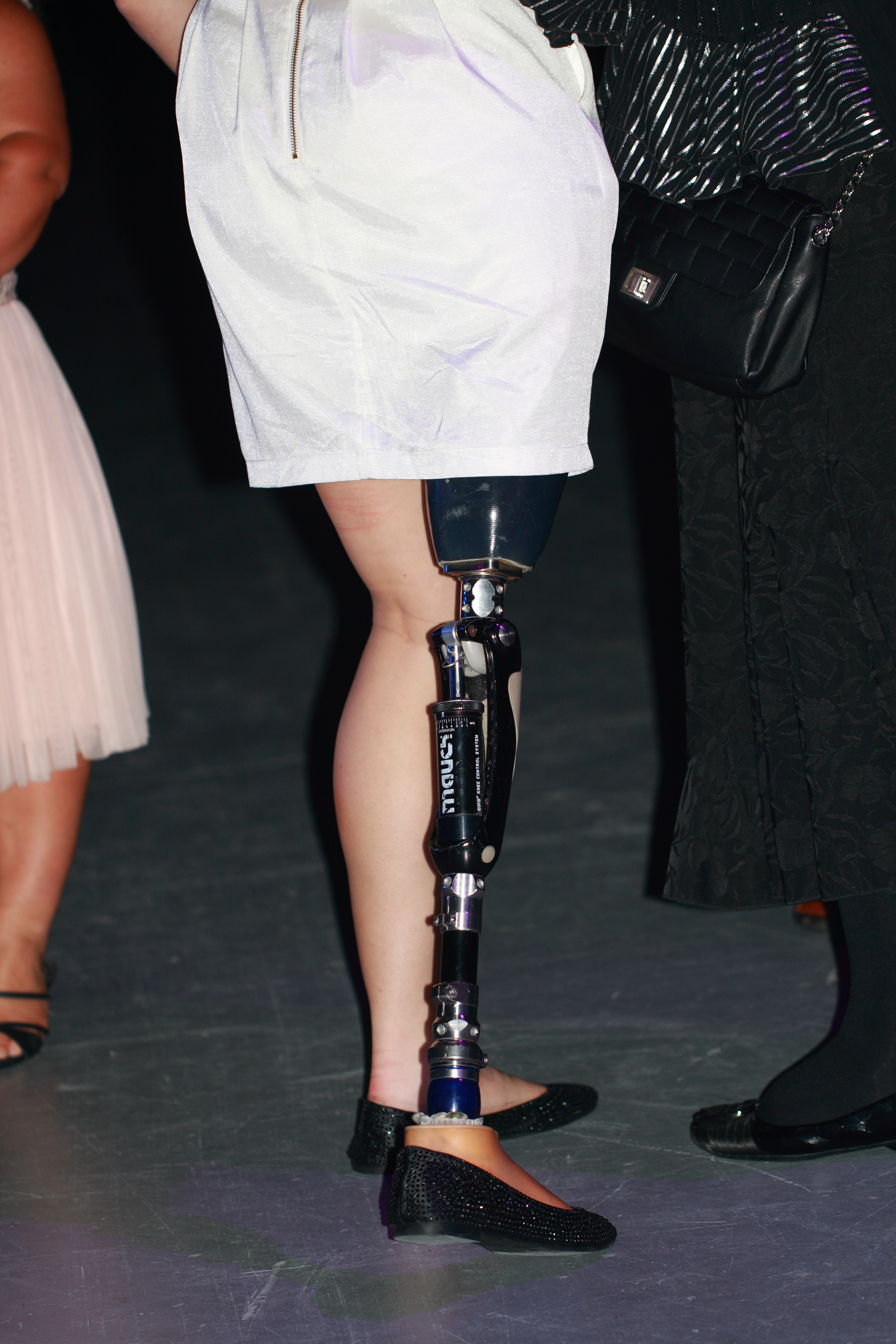
A prosthetic leg worn by Ellie Cole

Lower-extremity prosthetics describes artificially replaced limbs located at the hip level or lower. Concerning all ages Ephraim et al. (2003) found a worldwide estimate of all-cause lower-extremity amputations of 2.0–5.9 per 10,000 inhabitants. For birth prevalence rates of congenital limb deficiency they found an estimate between 3.5 and 7.1 cases per 10,000 births.

The two main subcategories of lower extremity prosthetic devices are trans-tibial (any amputation transecting the tibia bone or a congenital anomaly resulting in a tibial deficiency), and trans-femoral (any amputation transecting the femur bone or a congenital anomaly resulting in a femoral deficiency). In the prosthetic industry, a trans-tibial prosthetic leg is often referred to as a "BK" or below the knee prosthesis while the trans-femoral prosthetic leg is often referred to as an "AK" or above the knee prosthesis.

Other, less prevalent lower extremity cases include the following:

1. Hip disarticulations – This usually refers to when an amputee or congenitally challenged patient has either an amputation or anomaly at or in close proximity to the hip joint. See hip replacement
2. Knee disarticulations – This usually refers to an amputation through the knee disarticulating the femur from the tibia. See knee replacement
3. Symes – This is an ankle disarticulation while preserving the heel pad.

==== Socket ====
The socket serves as an interface between the residuum and the prosthesis, ideally allowing comfortable weight-bearing, movement control and proprioception. Socket problems, such as discomfort and skin breakdown, are rated among the most important issues faced by lower-limb amputees.

==== Shank and connectors ====
This part creates distance and support between the knee-joint and the foot (in case of an upper-leg prosthesis) or between the socket and the foot. The type of connectors that are used between the shank and the knee/foot determines whether the prosthesis is modular or not. Modular means that the angle and the displacement of the foot in respect to the socket can be changed after fitting. In developing countries prosthesis mostly are non-modular, in order to reduce cost. When considering children modularity of angle and height is important because of their average growth of 1.9 cm annually.

==== Foot ====
Providing contact to the ground, the foot provides shock absorption and stability during stance. Additionally it influences gait biomechanics by its shape and stiffness. This is because the trajectory of the center of pressure (COP) and the angle of the ground reaction forces is determined by the shape and stiffness of the foot and needs to match the subject's build in order to produce a normal gait pattern. Andrysek (2010) found 16 different types of feet, with greatly varying results concerning durability and biomechanics. The main problem found in current feet is durability, endurance ranging from 16 to 32 months These results are for adults and will probably be worse for children due to higher activity levels and scale effects. Evidence comparing different types of feet and ankle prosthetic devices is not strong enough to determine if one mechanism of ankle/foot is superior to another. When deciding on a device, the cost of the device, a person's functional need, and the availability of a particular device should be considered.

==== Knee joint ====
In case of a trans-femoral (above knee) amputation, there also is a need for a complex connector providing articulation, allowing flexion during swing-phase but not during stance. As its purpose is to replace the knee, the prosthetic knee joint is the most critical component of the prosthesis for trans-femoral amputees. The function of the good prosthetic knee joint is to mimic the function of the normal knee, such as providing structural support and stability during stance phase but able to flex in a controllable manner during swing phase. Hence it allows users to have a smooth and energy efficient gait and minimize the impact of amputation. The prosthetic knee is connected to the prosthetic foot by the shank, which is usually made of an aluminum or graphite tube.

One of the most important aspect of a prosthetic knee joint would be its stance-phase control mechanism. The function of stance-phase control is to prevent the leg from buckling when the limb is loaded during weight acceptance. This ensures the stability of the knee in order to support the single limb support task of stance phase and provides a smooth transition to the swing phase. Stance phase control can be achieved in several ways including the mechanical locks, relative alignment of prosthetic components, weight activated friction control, and polycentric mechanisms.

===== Microprocessor control =====
To mimic the knee's functionality during gait, microprocessor-controlled knee joints have been developed that control the flexion of the knee. Some examples are Otto Bock's C-leg, introduced in 1997, Ossur's Rheo Knee, released in 2005, the Power Knee by Ossur, introduced in 2006, the Plié Knee from Freedom Innovations and DAW Industries' Self Learning Knee (SLK).

The idea was originally developed by Kelly James, a Canadian engineer, at the University of Alberta.

A microprocessor is used to interpret and analyze signals from knee-angle sensors and moment sensors. The microprocessor receives signals from its sensors to determine the type of motion being employed by the amputee. Most microprocessor controlled knee-joints are powered by a battery housed inside the prosthesis.

The sensory signals computed by the microprocessor are used to control the resistance generated by hydraulic cylinders in the knee-joint. Small valves control the amount of hydraulic fluid that can pass into and out of the cylinder, thus regulating the extension and compression of a piston connected to the upper section of the knee.

The main advantage of a microprocessor-controlled prosthesis is a closer approximation to an amputee's natural gait. Some allow amputees to walk near walking speed or run. Variations in speed are also possible and are taken into account by sensors and communicated to the microprocessor, which adjusts to these changes accordingly. It also enables the amputees to walk downstairs with a step-over-step approach, rather than the one step at a time approach used with mechanical knees. There is some research suggesting that people with microprocessor-controlled prostheses report greater satisfaction and improvement in functionality, residual limb health, and safety. People may be able to perform everyday activities at greater speeds, even while multitasking, and reduce their risk of falls.

However, some have some significant drawbacks that impair its use. They can be susceptible to water damage and thus great care must be taken to ensure that the prosthesis remains dry.

=== Myoelectric ===
A myoelectric prosthesis uses the electrical tension generated every time a muscle contracts, as information. This tension can be captured from voluntarily contracted muscles by electrodes applied on the skin to control the movements of the prosthesis, such as elbow flexion/extension, wrist supination/pronation (rotation) or opening/closing of the fingers. A prosthesis of this type utilizes the residual neuromuscular system of the human body to control the functions of an electric powered prosthetic hand, wrist, elbow or foot. This is different from an electric switch prosthesis, which requires straps and/or cables actuated by body movements to actuate or operate switches that control the movements of the prosthesis. There is no clear evidence concluding that myoelectric upper extremity prostheses function better than body-powered prostheses. Advantages to using a myoelectric upper extremity prosthesis include the potential for improvement in cosmetic appeal (this type of prosthesis may have a more natural look), may be better for light everyday activities, and may be beneficial for people experiencing phantom limb pain. When compared to a body-powered prosthesis, a myoelectric prosthesis may not be as durable, may have a longer training time, may require more adjustments, may need more maintenance, and does not provide feedback to the user.

Prof. Alvaro Ríos Poveda has been working for several years on a non-invasive and affordable solution to this feedback problem. He considers that: "Prosthetic limbs that can be controlled with thought hold great promise for the amputee, but without sensorial feedback from the signals returning to the brain, it can be difficult to achieve the level of control necessary to perform precise movements. When connecting the sense of touch from a mechanical hand directly to the brain, prosthetics can restore the function of the amputated limb in an almost natural-feeling way." He presented the first Myoelectric prosthetic hand with sensory feedback at the XVIII World Congress on Medical Physics and Biomedical Engineering, 1997, held in Nice, France.

The USSR was the first to develop a myoelectric arm in 1958, while the first myoelectric arm became commercial in 1964 by the Central Prosthetic Research Institute of the USSR, and distributed by the Hangar Limb Factory of the UK. Myoelectric prosthesis are expensive, require regular maintenance, and are sensitive to sweat and moisture.

=== Robotic prostheses ===
Brain control of 3D prosthetic arm movement (hitting targets). This movie was recorded when the participant controlled the 3D movement of a prosthetic arm to hit physical targets in a research lab.

Robots can be used to generate objective measures of patient's impairment and therapy outcome, assist in diagnosis, customize therapies based on patient's motor abilities, and assure compliance with treatment regimens and maintain patient's records. It is shown in many studies that there is a significant improvement in upper limb motor function after stroke using robotics for upper limb rehabilitation. In order for a robotic prosthetic limb to work, it must have several components to integrate it into the body's function: Biosensors detect signals from the user's nervous or muscular systems. It then relays this information to a microcontroller located inside the device, and processes feedback from the limb and actuator, e.g., position or force, and sends it to the controller. Examples include surface electrodes that detect electrical activity on the skin, needle electrodes implanted in muscle, or solid-state electrode arrays with nerves growing through them. One type of these biosensors are employed in myoelectric prostheses.

A device known as the controller is connected to the user's nerve and muscular systems and the device itself. It sends intention commands from the user to the actuators of the device and interprets feedback from the mechanical and biosensors to the user. The controller is also responsible for the monitoring and control of the movements of the device.

An actuator mimics the actions of a muscle in producing force and movement. Examples include a motor that aids or replaces original muscle tissue.

Targeted muscle reinnervation (TMR) is a technique in which motor nerves, which previously controlled muscles on an amputated limb, are surgically rerouted such that they reinnervate a small region of a large, intact muscle, such as the pectoralis major. As a result, when a patient thinks about moving the thumb of their missing hand, a small area of muscle on their chest will contract instead. By placing sensors over the reinnervated muscle, these contractions can be made to control the movement of an appropriate part of the robotic prosthesis.

A variant of this technique is called targeted sensory reinnervation (TSR). This procedure is similar to TMR, except that sensory nerves are surgically rerouted to skin on the chest, rather than motor nerves rerouted to muscle. Recently, robotic limbs have improved in their ability to take signals from the human brain and translate those signals into motion in the artificial limb. DARPA, the Pentagon's research division, is working to make even more advancements in this area. Their desire is to create an artificial limb that ties directly into the nervous system.

==== Robotic arms ====
Advancements in the processors used in myoelectric arms have allowed developers to make gains in fine-tuned control of the prosthetic. The Boston Digital Arm is a recent artificial limb that has taken advantage of these more advanced processors. The arm allows movement in five axes and allows the arm to be programmed for a more customized feel. Recently the I-LIMB Hand, invented in Edinburgh, Scotland, by David Gow has become the first commercially available hand prosthesis with five individually powered digits. The hand also possesses a manually rotatable thumb which is operated passively by the user and allows the hand to grip in precision, power, and key grip modes.

Another neural prosthetic is Johns Hopkins University Applied Physics Laboratory Proto 1. Besides the Proto 1, the university also finished the Proto 2 in 2010. Early in 2013, Max Ortiz Catalan and Rickard Brånemark of the Chalmers University of Technology, and Sahlgrenska University Hospital in Sweden, succeeded in making the first robotic arm which is mind-controlled and can be permanently attached to the body (using osseointegration).

An approach that is very useful is called arm rotation which is common for unilateral amputees which is an amputation that affects only one side of the body; and also essential for bilateral amputees, a person who is missing or has had amputated either both arms or legs, to carry out activities of daily living. This involves inserting a small permanent magnet into the distal end of the residual bone of subjects with upper limb amputations. When a subject rotates the residual arm, the magnet will rotate with the residual bone, causing a change in magnetic field distribution. EEG (electroencephalogram) signals, detected using small flat metal discs attached to the scalp, essentially decoding human brain activity used for physical movement, is used to control the robotic limbs. This allows the user to control the part directly.

==== Robotic transtibial prostheses ====
The research of robotic legs has made some advancement over time, allowing exact movement and control.

Researchers at the Rehabilitation Institute of Chicago announced in September 2013 that they have developed a robotic leg that translates neural impulses from the user's thigh muscles into movement, which is the first prosthetic leg to do so. It is currently in testing.

Hugh Herr, head of the biomechatronics group at MIT's Media Lab developed a robotic transtibial leg (PowerFoot BiOM).

The Icelandic company Össur has also created a robotic transtibial leg with a motorized ankle that moves through algorithms and sensors that automatically adjust the angle of the foot during different points in its wearer's stride. Also there are brain-controlled bionic legs that allow an individual to move his limbs with a wireless transmitter.

==== Prosthesis design ====
The main goal of a robotic prosthesis is to provide active actuation during gait to improve the biomechanics of gait, including, among other things, stability, symmetry, or energy expenditure for amputees. There are several powered prosthetic legs currently on the market, including fully powered legs, in which actuators directly drive the joints, and semi-active legs, which use small amounts of energy and a small actuator to change the mechanical properties of the leg but do not inject net positive energy into gait. Specific examples include The emPOWER from BionX, the Proprio Foot from Ossur, and the Elan Foot from Endolite. Various research groups have also experimented with robotic legs over the last decade. Central issues being researched include designing the behavior of the device during stance and swing phases, recognizing the current ambulation task, and various mechanical design problems such as robustness, weight, battery-life/efficiency, and noise-level. However, scientists from Stanford University and Seoul National University has developed artificial nerves system that will help prosthetic limbs feel. This synthetic nerve system enables prosthetic limbs sense braille, feel the sense of touch and respond to the environment.

=== Use of recycled materials ===
Prosthetics are being made from recycled plastic bottles and lids around the world.

== Direct bone attachment and osseointegration ==
Most prostheses are attached to the exterior of the body in a non-permanent way. The stump and socket method can cause significant pain for the person, which is why direct bone attachment has been explored extensively.

Osseointegration is a method of attaching the artificial limb to the body by a prosthetic implant. This method is also sometimes referred to as exoprosthesis (attaching an artificial limb to the bone), or endo-exoprosthesis. Endoprosthesis are prosthetic joint implants which remain wholly inside the body such as knee and hip replacement implants.

The method works by inserting a titanium bolt into the bone at the end of the stump. After several months the bone attaches itself to the titanium bolt and an abutment is attached to the titanium bolt. The abutment extends out of the stump and the (removable) artificial limb is then attached to the abutment. Some of the benefits of this method include the following:

- Better muscle control of the prosthetic.
- The ability to wear the prosthetic for an extended period of time; with the stump and socket method this is not possible.
- The ability for transfemoral amputees to drive a car.

The main disadvantage of this method is that amputees with the direct bone attachment cannot have large impacts on the limb, such as those experienced during jogging, because of the potential for the bone to break.

== Cosmesis ==
Cosmetic prosthesis has long been used to disguise injuries and disfigurements. With advances in modern technology, cosmesis, the creation of lifelike limbs made from silicone or PVC, has been made possible. Such prosthetics, including artificial hands, can now be designed to simulate the appearance of real hands, complete with freckles, veins, hair, fingerprints and even tattoos. Custom-made cosmeses are generally more expensive (costing thousands of U.S. dollars, depending on the level of detail), while standard cosmeses come premade in a variety of sizes, although they are often not as realistic as their custom-made counterparts. Another option is the custom-made silicone cover, which can be made to match a person's skin tone but not details such as freckles or wrinkles. Cosmeses are attached to the body in any number of ways, using an adhesive, suction, form-fitting, stretchable skin, or a skin sleeve.

== Cognition ==
Unlike neuromotor prostheses, neurocognitive prostheses would sense or modulate neural function in order to physically reconstitute or augment cognitive processes such as executive function, attention, language, and memory. No neurocognitive prostheses are currently available but the development of implantable neurocognitive brain-computer interfaces has been proposed to help treat conditions such as stroke, traumatic brain injury, cerebral palsy, autism, and Alzheimer's disease. The recent field of Assistive Technology for Cognition concerns the development of technologies to augment human cognition. Scheduling devices such as Neuropage remind users with memory impairments when to perform certain activities, such as visiting the doctor. Micro-prompting devices such as PEAT, AbleLink and Guide have been used to aid users with memory and executive function problems perform activities of daily living.

== Prosthetic enhancement ==
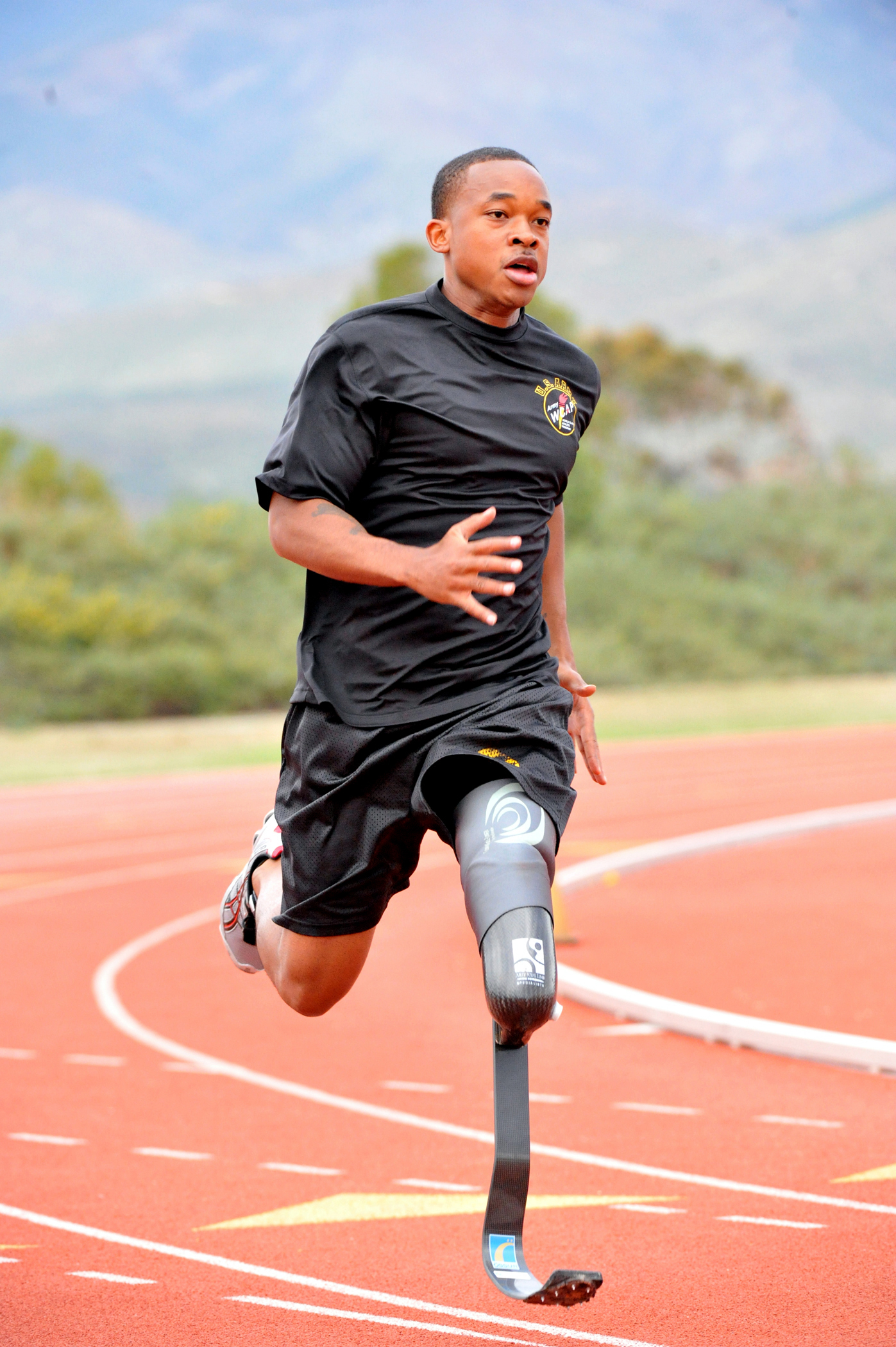
Sgt. Jerrod Fields works out at the U.S. Olympic Training Center in Chula Vista, California.

In addition to the standard artificial limb for everyday use, many amputees or congenital patients have special limbs and devices to aid in the participation of sports and recreational activities.

Within science fiction, and, more recently, within the scientific community, there has been consideration given to using advanced prostheses to replace healthy body parts with artificial mechanisms and systems to improve function. The morality and desirability of such technologies are being debated by transhumanists, other ethicists, and others in general. Body parts such as legs, arms, hands, feet, and others can be replaced.

The first experiment with a healthy individual appears to have been that by the British scientist Kevin Warwick. In 2002, an implant was interfaced directly into Warwick's nervous system. The electrode array, which contained around a hundred electrodes, was placed in the median nerve. The signals produced were detailed enough that a robot arm was able to mimic the actions of Warwick's own arm and provide a form of touch feedback again via the implant.

The DEKA company of Dean Kamen developed the "Luke arm", an advanced nerve-controlled prosthetic. Clinical trials began in 2008, with FDA approval in 2014 and commercial manufacturing by the Universal Instruments Corporation expected in 2017. The price offered at retail by Mobius Bionics is expected to be around $100,000.

Further research in April 2019, there have been improvements towards prosthetic function and comfort of 3D-printed personalized wearable systems. Instead of manual integration after printing, integrating electronic sensors at the intersection between a prosthetic and the wearer's tissue can gather information such as pressure across wearer's tissue, that can help improve further iteration of these types of prosthetic.

=== Oscar Pistorius ===
In early 2008, Oscar Pistorius, the "Blade Runner" of South Africa, was briefly ruled ineligible to compete in the 2008 Summer Olympics because his transtibial prosthesis limbs were said to give him an unfair advantage over runners who had ankles. One researcher found that his limbs used twenty-five percent less energy than those of a non-disabled runner moving at the same speed. This ruling was overturned on appeal, with the appellate court stating that the overall set of advantages and disadvantages of Pistorius' limbs had not been considered.

Pistorius did not qualify for the South African team for the Olympics, but went on to sweep the 2008 Summer Paralympics, and has been ruled eligible to qualify for any future Olympics. He qualified for the 2011 World Championship in South Korea and reached the semi-final where he ended last timewise, he was 14th in the first round, his personal best at 400m would have given him 5th place in the finals. At the 2012 Summer Olympics in London, Pistorius became the first amputee runner to compete at an Olympic Games. He ran in the 400 metres race semi-finals, and the 4 × 400 metres relay race finals. He also competed in 5 events in the 2012 Summer Paralympics in London.

== Design considerations ==
There are multiple factors to consider when designing a transtibial prosthesis. Manufacturers must make choices about their priorities regarding these factors.

=== Performance ===
Nonetheless, there are certain elements of socket and foot mechanics that are invaluable for the athlete, and these are the focus of today's high-tech prosthetics companies:

- Fit – athletic/active amputees, or those with bony residua, may require a carefully detailed socket fit; less-active patients may be comfortable with a 'total contact' fit and gel liner
- Energy storage and return – storage of energy acquired through ground contact and utilization of that stored energy for propulsion
- Energy absorption – minimizing the effect of high impact on the musculoskeletal system
- Ground compliance – stability independent of terrain type and angle
- Rotation – ease of changing direction
- Weight – maximizing comfort, balance and speed
- Suspension – how the socket will join and fit to the limb

=== Other ===
The buyer is also concerned with numerous other factors:

- Cosmetics
- Cost
- Ease of use
- Size availability

=== Design for Prosthetics ===
A key feature of prosthetics and prosthetic design is the idea of "designing for disabilities." This might sound like a good idea in which people with disabilities can participate in equitable design but this is unfortunately not true. The idea of designing for disabilities is first problematic because of the underlying meaning of disabilities. It tells amputees that there is a right and wrong way to move and walk and that if amputees are adapted to the surrounding environment by their own means, then that is the wrong way. Along with that underlying meaning of disabilities, many people designing for disabilities are not actually disabled. "Design for disability" from these experiences, takes disability as the object - with the feeling from non-disabled designers that they have properly learned about their job from their own simulation of the experience. The simulation is misleading and does a disservice to disabled people - so the design that flows from this is highly problematic. Engaging in disability design should be... with, ideally, team members who have the relevant disability and are part of communities that matter to the research. This leads to people, who do not know what the day-to-day personal experiences are, designing materials that do not meet the needs or hinder the needs of people with actual disabilities.

== Cost and source freedom ==
=== High-cost ===
In the United States, a typical prosthetic limb costs anywhere between $15,000 and $90,000, depending on the type of limb desired by the patient. With medical insurance, a patient will typically pay 10%–50% of the total cost of a prosthetic limb, while the insurance company will cover the rest of the cost. The percent that the patient pays varies on the type of insurance plan, as well as the limb requested by the patient. In the United Kingdom, much of Europe, Australia and New Zealand the entire cost of prosthetic limbs is met by state funding or statutory insurance. For example, in Australia prostheses are fully funded by state schemes in the case of amputation due to disease, and by workers compensation or traffic injury insurance in the case of most traumatic amputations. The National Disability Insurance Scheme, which is being rolled out nationally between 2017 and 2020 also pays for prostheses.

Transradial (below the elbow amputation) and transtibial prostheses (below the knee amputation) typically cost between US $6,000 and $8,000, while transfemoral (above the knee amputation) and transhumeral prosthetics (above the elbow amputation) cost approximately twice as much with a range of $10,000 to $15,000 and can sometimes reach costs of $35,000. The cost of an artificial limb often recurs, while a limb typically needs to be replaced every 3–4 years due to wear and tear of everyday use. In addition, if the socket has fit issues, the socket must be replaced within several months from the onset of pain. If height is an issue, components such as pylons can be changed.

Not only does the patient need to pay for their multiple prosthetic limbs, but they also need to pay for physical and occupational therapy that come along with adapting to living with an artificial limb. Unlike the reoccurring cost of the prosthetic limbs, the patient will typically only pay the $2000 to $5000 for therapy during the first year or two of living as an amputee. Once the patient is strong and comfortable with their new limb, they will not be required to go to therapy anymore. Throughout one's life, it is projected that a typical amputee will go through $1.4 million worth of treatment, including surgeries, prosthetics, as well as therapies.

=== Low-cost ===
Low-cost above-knee prostheses often provide only basic structural support with limited function. This function is often achieved with crude, non-articulating, unstable, or manually locking knee joints. A limited number of organizations, such as the International Committee of the Red Cross (ICRC), create devices for developing countries. Their device which is manufactured by CR Equipments is a single-axis, manually operated locking polymer prosthetic knee joint.

Table. List of knee joint technologies based on the literature review.

Name of technology (country of origin)	Brief description	Highest level of evidence
ICRC knee (Switzerland)	Single-axis with manual lock	Independent field
ATLAS knee (UK)	Weight-activated friction	Independent field
POF/OTRC knee (US)	Single-axis with ext. assist	Field
DAV/Seattle knee (US)	Compliant polycentric	Field
LIMBS International M1 knee (US)	Four-bar	Field
JaipurKnee (India)	Four-bar	Field
LCKnee (Canada)	Single-axis with automatic lock	Field
None provided (Nepal)	Single-axis	Field
None provided (New Zealand)	Roto-molded single-axis	Field
None provided (India)	Six-bar with squatting	Technical development
Friction knee (US)	Weight-activated friction	Technical development
Wedgelock knee (Australia)	Weight-activated friction	Technical development
SATHI friction knee (India)	Weight-activated friction	Limited data available

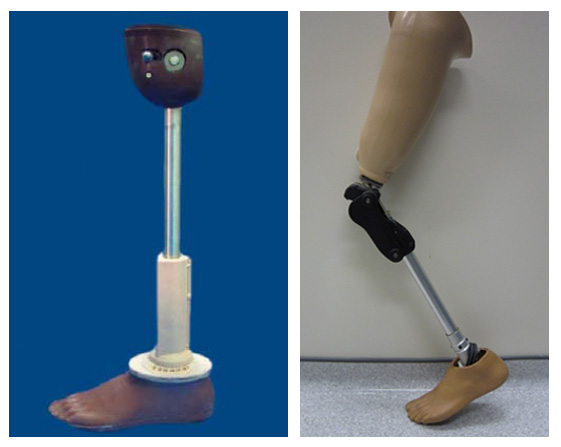
Low-cost above-knee prosthetic limbs: ICRC Knee (left) and LC Knee (right)

A plan for a low-cost artificial leg, designed by Sébastien Dubois, was featured at the 2007 International Design Exhibition and award show in Copenhagen, Denmark, where it won the Index: Award. It would be able to create an energy-return prosthetic leg for US $8.00, composed primarily of fiberglass.

Prior to the 1980s, foot prostheses merely restored basic walking capabilities. These early devices can be characterized by a simple artificial attachment connecting one's residual limb to the ground.

The introduction of the Seattle Foot (Seattle Limb Systems) in 1981 revolutionized the field, bringing the concept of an Energy Storing Prosthetic Foot (ESPF) to the fore. Other companies soon followed suit, and before long, there were multiple models of energy storing prostheses on the market. Each model utilized some variation of a compressible heel. The heel is compressed during initial ground contact, storing energy which is then returned during the latter phase of ground contact to help propel the body forward.

Since then, the foot prosthetics industry has been dominated by steady, small improvements in performance, comfort, and marketability.

With 3D printers, it is possible to manufacture a single product without having to have metal molds, so the costs can be drastically reduced.

Jaipur foot, an artificial limb from Jaipur, India, costs about US$40.

=== Open-source robotic prosthesis ===
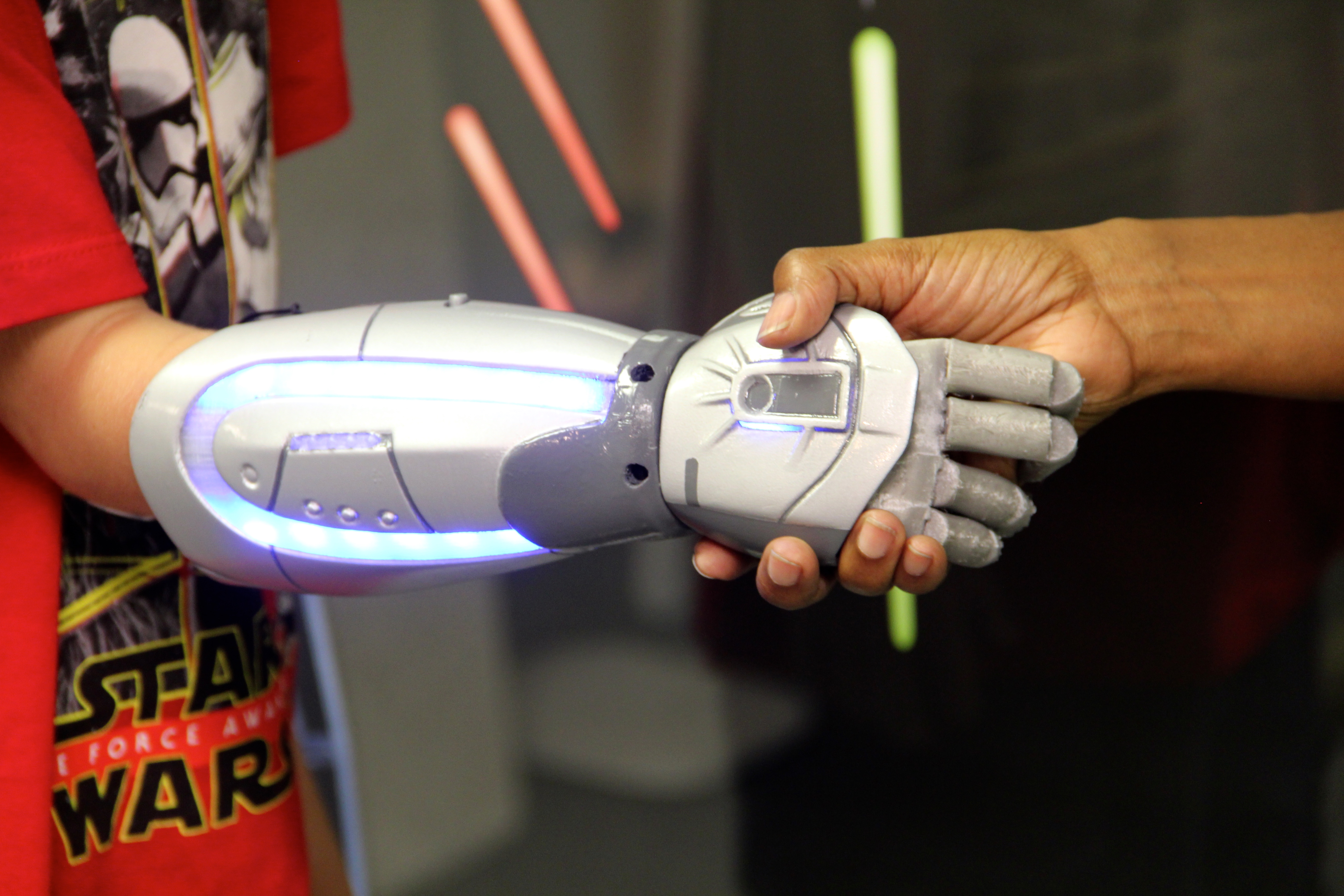
Star Wars themed "Hero Arm" by Open Bionics

There is currently an open-design Prosthetics forum known as the "Open Prosthetics Project". The group employs collaborators and volunteers to advance Prosthetics technology while attempting to lower the costs of these necessary devices. Open Bionics is a company that is developing open-source robotic prosthetic hands. They utilize 3D printing to manufacture the devices and low-cost 3D scanners to fit them onto the residual limb of a specific patient. Open Bionics' use of 3D printing allows for more personalized designs, such as the "Hero Arm" which incorporates the users favourite colours, textures, and even aesthetics to look like superheroes or characters from Star Wars with the aim of lowering the cost. A review study on a wide range of printed prosthetic hands found that 3D printing technology holds a promise for individualised prosthesis design, is cheaper than commercial prostheses available on the market, and is more expensive than mass production processes such as injection molding. The same study also found that evidence on the functionality, durability and user acceptance of 3D printed hand prostheses is still lacking.

== Low-cost prosthetics for children ==
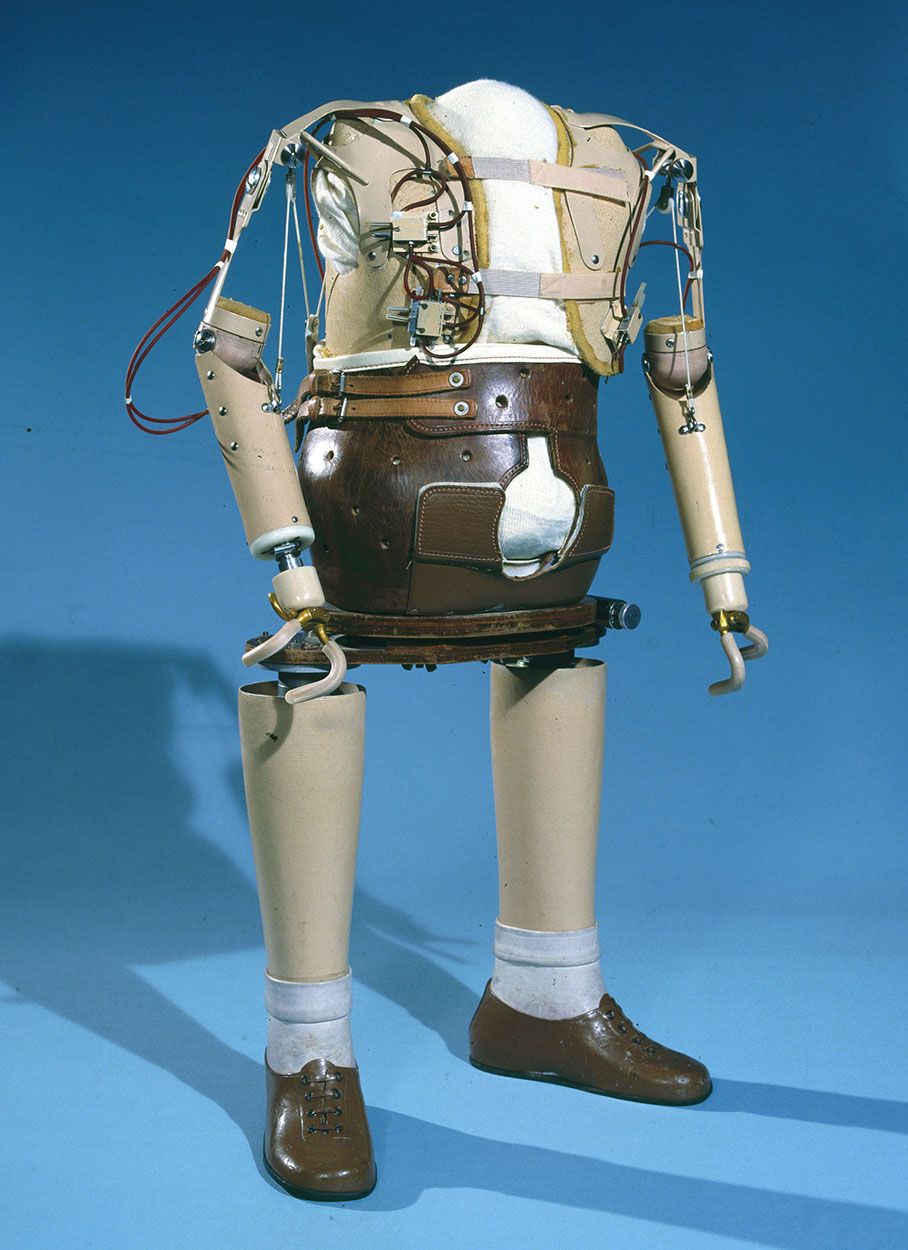
Artificial limbs for a juvenile thalidomide survivor 1961–1965

In the USA an estimate was found of 32,500 children (<21 years) had a major paediatric amputation, with 5,525 new cases each year, of which 3,315 congenital.

Carr et al. (1998) investigated amputations caused by landmines for Afghanistan, Bosnia and Herzegovina, Cambodia and Mozambique among children (<14 years), showing estimates of respectively 4.7, 0.19, 1.11 and 0.67 per 1000 children. Mohan (1986) indicated in India a total of 424,000 amputees (23,500 annually), of which 10.3% had an onset of disability below the age of 14, amounting to a total of about 43,700 limb deficient children in India alone.

Few low-cost solutions have been created specially for children. Examples of low-cost prosthetic devices include the following:

=== Pole and crutch ===
A pole and crutch system consists of a pole with a leather support band or platform for the limb. It is one of the simplest and cheapest solutions found. It serves well as a short-term solution, but is prone to rapid contracture formation if the limb is not stretched daily through a series of range-of-motion sets.

=== Bamboo, PVC or plaster limbs ===
This system consists of a plaster socket with a bamboo or PVC pipe at the bottom, optionally attached to a prosthetic foot. This solution prevents contractures because the knee is moved through its full RoM. The David Werner Collection, an online database for the assistance of disabled village children, displays manuals of production of these solutions.

=== Adjustable bicycle limb ===
This is built using a bicycle seat post up side down as foot, generating flexibility and (length) adjustability. It is a very cheap solution, using locally available materials.

=== Sathi limb ===
A Sathi limb is an endoskeletal modular lower limb from India, which uses thermoplastic parts. Their main advantages are their small weight and adaptability.

=== Monolimb ===
Monolimbs are non-modular prostheses and thus require a more experienced prosthetist for correct fitting, because alignment can hardly be changed after production. However, their durability on average is better than low-cost modular solutions.

== Cultural and social theory perspectives ==
A number of theorists have explored the meaning and implications of prosthetic extension of the body. Elizabeth Grosz writes, "Creatures use tools, ornaments, and appliances to augment their bodily capacities. Are their bodies lacking something, which they need to replace with artificial or substitute organs?...Or conversely, should prostheses be understood, in terms of aesthetic reorganization and proliferation, as the consequence of an inventiveness that functions beyond and perhaps in defiance of pragmatic need?" Elaine Scarry argues that every artifact recreates and extends the body. Chairs supplement the skeleton, tools append the hands, clothing augments the skin. In Scarry's thinking, "furniture and houses are neither more nor less interior to the human body than the food it absorbs, nor are they fundamentally different from such sophisticated prosthetics as artificial lungs, eyes and kidneys. The consumption of manufactured things turns the body inside out, opening it up to and as the culture of objects." Mark Wigley, a professor of architecture, continues this line of thinking about how architecture supplements our natural capabilities, and argues that "a blurring of identity is produced by all prostheses." Some of this work relies on Freud's earlier characterization of man's relation to objects as one of extension.

=== Social implications ===
Prosthetics can play a vital role in how a person perceives themselves and how other people perceive them. Using a prosthesis can enable a person to ward off social stigmatization or gather further self-confidence, reducing emotional problems surrounding such disability. For people who have received amputations, especially due to sudden illness or trauma, the emotions around their limb loss may also affect their experience with their prosthesis. A prosthesis might help restore a person's connection to their body, but could also feel like another intrusion during a painful process.

Although many people receive emotional benefits from wearing a prosthesis, others dislike how it attempts to hide and 'normalize' their body for other people's comfort, especially in the case of prostheses that provide no practical function. In Audre Lorde's book The Cancer Journals, she argued for why she chose not to wear a breast prosthesis after a mastectomy: "Prosthesis offers the empty comfort of 'Nobody will know the difference.'"

=== Ethical concerns ===
There are also many ethical concerns about how the prosthetics are made and produced. A wide range of ethical issues arise in connection with experiments and clinical usage of sensory prostheses: animal experimentation; informed consent, for instance, in patients with a locked-in syndrome that may be alleviated with a sensory prosthesis; unrealistic expectations of research subjects testing new devices. How prosthetics come to be and testing of the usability of the device is a major concern in the medical world. Although many positives come when a new prosthetic design is announced, how the device got to where it is leads to some questioning the ethics of prosthetics.

=== Debates ===
There are also many debates among the prosthetic community about whether they should wear prosthetics at all. This is sparked by whether prosthetics help in day-to-day living or make it harder. Many people have adapted to their loss of limb making it work for them and do not need a prosthesis in their life. Not all amputees will wear a prosthesis. In a 2011 national survey of Australian amputees, Limbs 4 Life found that 7 percent of amputees do not wear a prosthesis, and in another Australian hospital study, this number was closer to 20 percent. Many people report being uncomfortable in prostheses and not wanting to wear them, even reporting that wearing a prosthetic is more cumbersome than not having one at all.

== Notable users of prosthetic devices ==
- Henry William Paget, 1st Marquess of Anglesey (1768–1854), known as Lord Uxbridge at the time, whose leg was amputated at the Battle of Waterloo
- Jane Gordon, Duchess of Gordon wore a carved finger in a glove after a childhood accident.
- Marie Moentmann (1900–1974), child survivor of industrial accident
- Terry Fox (1958–1981), Canadian athlete, humanitarian, and cancer research activist
- Oscar Pistorius (born 1986), South African former professional sprinter
- Harold Russell (1914–2002), WWII veteran, Academy Award-winning actor

== Mythological ==
- Nuada, mythical king loses his arm in battle but is given a silver arm in its place.
- Visphala, mentioned in the Rigveda as losing a leg in battle, but being given "leg of iron".

== See also ==
- Artificial organ, heart, bone, skin, uterus, kidney
- Bionics
- Capua Leg
- Cybernetics
- Cyborg
- Robotic arm
- Transhumanism
- Whole brain emulation
