= I Am Me (disambiguation) =

I Am Me is an album by Ashlee Simpson.

I Am Me may also refer to:

== Books and TV ==
- I Am Me: Rhymes for Small, a book of poetry by Robin Skelton
- "I Am Me", an episode of Tweenies
- I Am Me, a children's picture book by Mira Lobe

== Music ==
- I.aM.mE, a hip hop dance crew best known for their appearance on America's Best Dance Crew
- I Am Me, an album by Yuya Matsushita
- I Am Me, a 2019 album by BlocBoy JB
- "I Am Me", a song by Diana Ross from Silk Electric
- "I Am Me", a song by Step Forward from It Did Make a Difference
- "I'm Me", a song by Lil Wayne
- "Ja to Ja" ("I'm Myself") a song by Paktofonika
- "I am Me", a 2020 techno song made by DAGames, made for the computer game Boris and the Dark Survival
- I Am Me. (Weki Meki EP), a 2021 extended play by Weki Meki

== See also ==
- IME (disambiguation)
