= Capua Leg =

Ancient artificial leg found in Italy

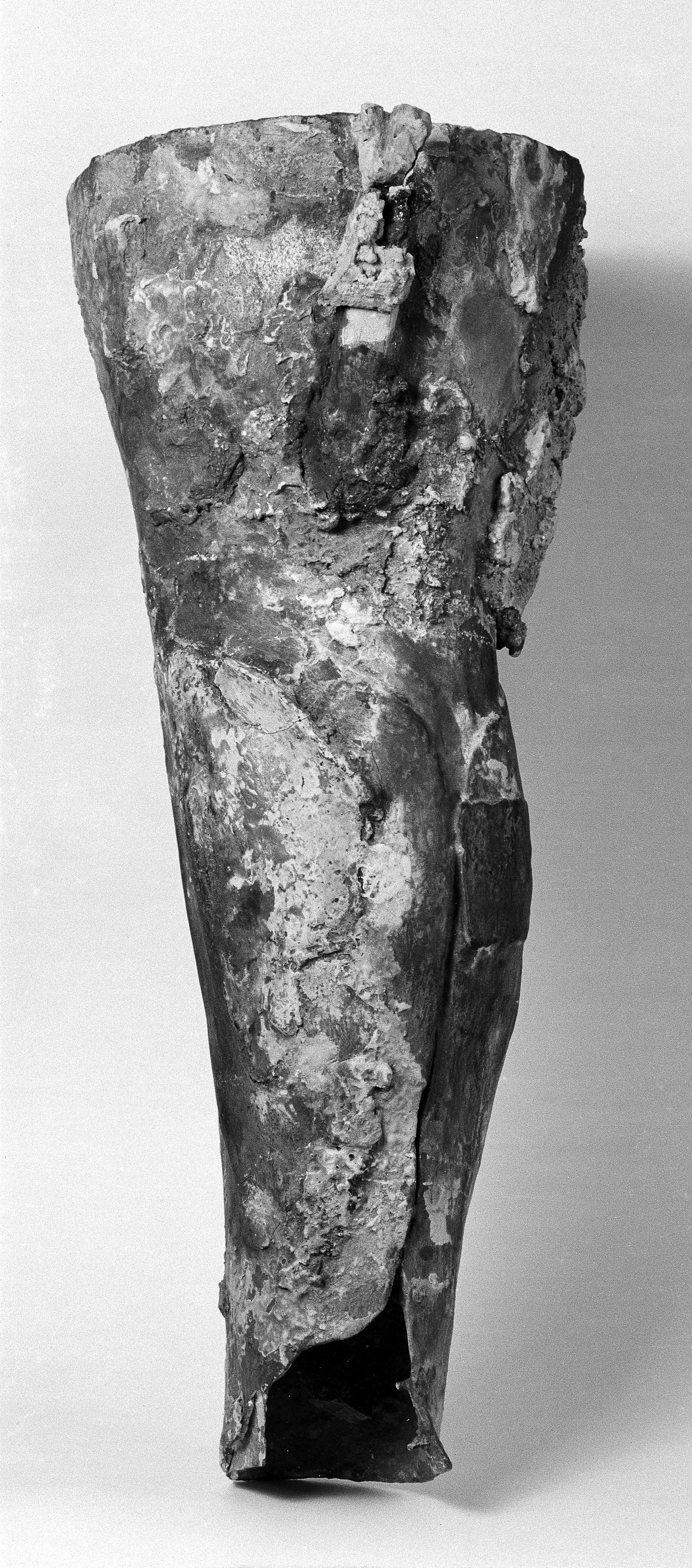
The Capua leg (replica)

The Capua leg was an artificial leg made of bronze found in a grave in Capua, Italy in about 1884. Dating from 300 BC, the leg is one of the earliest known prosthetic limbs. There was no sign of an artificial foot which may have been made from a valuable metal. The limb was kept at the Royal College of Surgeons in London, but was destroyed in World War II during an air raid. A copy of the limb is held at the Science Museum, London. and another was made by 3D printing in 2021.

== Bibliography ==
- Von Brunn, Walther: Der Stelzfuß von Capua und die antiken Prothesen. In: Archiv für Geschichte der Medizin. Vol. 18, No. 4 (1. November 1926). Stuttgart: Steiner, 1926, pp. 351–360. (in German)
- Bliquez, Lawrence J.: Prosthetics in Classical Antiquity: Greek, Etruscan, and Roman Prosthetics. In: Haase, Wolfgang; Temproini, Hildegard (ed.): Aufstieg und Niedergang der römischen Welt. Teil II: Principat, Vol. 37.3. Berlin / New York: De Gruyter, 1996, pp. 2640–2676.
