= Implantable myoelectric sensors =

Implanted sensor measuring muscle movement

An implantable myoelectric sensor (IMES) is a sensor implanted in or near a muscular region of the body in order to read the electric outputs of the muscles. This allows the device to measure the exact degree of activation of the muscle. This device is primarily used in disabled individuals as a detection module that feeds information regarding movement to externally powered and controlled prosthetics (e.g. synthetic arm, leg, etc.). The IMES was invented by Dr. Richard F. ff. Weir of the Rehabilitation Institute of Chicago and Dr. Philip Troyk of the Illinois Institute of Technology, with the first experimental studies performed by Jack F. Schorsch of the Rehabilitation Institute of Chicago.

IMES are an implantable electromyographic sensor meaning that they work by picking up on the electrical outputs of muscles. They do this by detecting the electrical potential across the terminal electrodes of this device. These potentials are representative of the electrical activity of nearby muscles. After acquisition, the potentials are amplified and digitized before transmission. Transmission occurs over a band separated tx/rx link. Generally multiple IMES are implanted into discrete muscles or muscle compartments to increase the sensitivity of the individual implant for that muscle. The IMES control unit is capable of allocating total available bandwidth across the number of implants in the system, and supports up to 16 implants on an individual base station. By using multiple implants, it is possible to use machine learning and pattern recognition techniques to estimate movement intent.

Power and data transmission are accomplished over a shared inductive link. There are no internal batteries for the IMES device, and no dedicated onboard memory resources for the implanted, and it must remain within the inductive power field to operate.

== See also ==
- Myoelectric Prosthesis
