= Independent medical examination =

Medical assessment by an independent person

An independent medical examination (IME) is a medical evaluation performed on a patient by a medical professional who was not previously involved in the treatment of that patient, to evaluate the patient's course of prior treatment and current condition. IMEs are conducted by doctors, psychologists, and other licensed healthcare professionals in essentially all medical disciplines, depending on the purpose of the exam and the claimed injuries.

Such examinations are generally conducted in the context of a legal or administrative proceeding, at the request of the party opposing the patient's request for benefits. IMEs are commonly held in the context of workers' compensation cases, disability claims, and personal injury litigation.

== Limited doctor-patient relationship ==
Conducting an independent medical examination does not establish a typical doctor/therapist-patient relationship as exists when a clinician treats a patient in the hospital or at an outpatient clinic. However, the independent, objective (unbiased) nature of the examination does not absolve the doctor from all professional responsibilities. For example, in most independent medical examinations, the clinician should assess for possible psychiatric disorders and ask the individual if he or she has been thinking of hurting or killing themselves or someone else. If upon further questioning after an affirmative response it becomes apparent that the person poses a significant risk of imminent harm to self or others, the examiner must take steps to prevent such harm and to facilitate referral to appropriate treatment and psychosocial support. Thus, a "limited doctor-patient relationship" exists when conducting independent medical examinations.

== Workers' compensation and long-term disability insurance ==
Independent medical examinations may be conducted to determine the cause, extent and medical treatment of a work-related or other injury where liability is at issue; whether an individual has reached maximum benefit from treatment; and whether any permanent impairment remains after treatment. An independent medical examination may be conducted at the behest of an employer or an insurance carrier to obtain an independent opinion of the clinical status of the individual. Workers' compensation insurance carriers, auto insurance carriers, and self-insured employers have a legal right to this request. Should the doctor/therapist performing the independent medical examination conclude that a patient's medical condition is not related to a compensable event, the insurer may deny the claim and refuse payment.
