= Vishpala =

Woman mentioned in Rigveda

Vishpala (viśpálā) is a woman (alternatively, a horse) mentioned in the Rigveda (RV 1.112.10, 116.15, 117.11, 118.8 and RV 10.39.8). The name is likely from viś "settlement, village" and bala "strong", meaning something like "protecting the settlement" or "strong settlement".

Vishpala is helped in battle (alternative, in the prize-race) by the Ashvins. As she lost her leg "in the time of night, in Khela's battle" (alternatively, "in Khela's race, eager for a decision"), they gave her a "leg of iron" so that she could keep running (1.116.15).

The interpretation as a female warrior in battle is due to Griffith (in keeping with Sayana), the interpretation as a horse race is due to Karl Friedrich Geldner.

As is often the case in the Rigveda, especially in the young books 1 and 10 (dated to roughly 1200 BC) a myth is only alluded to, the poet taking for granted his audience's being familiar with it, and beyond the fact that the Ashvins gave Vishpala a new leg, no information has survived, neither about Vishpala herself nor about "Khela's battle", or indeed the character of Khela (the name meaning "shaking, trembling").

== See also ==
- Woman warrior
- List of women warriors in folklore
