= Intron-mediated enhancement =

Intron-mediated enhancement (IME) is the ability of an intron sequence to enhance the expression of a gene containing that intron. In particular, the intron must be present in the transcribed region of the gene for enhancement to occur, differentiating IME from the action of typical transcriptional enhancers. Descriptions of this phenomenon were first published in cultured maize cells in 1987, and the term "intron-mediated enhancement" was subsequently coined in 1990. A number of publications have demonstrated that this phenomenon is conserved across eukaryotes, including humans, mice, Arabidopsis, rice, and C. elegans. However, the mechanism(s) by which IME works are still not completely understood.

When testing to see whether any given intron enhances the expression of a gene, it is typical to compare the expression of two constructs, one containing the intron and one without it, and to express the difference between the two results as a "fold increase" in enhancement. Further experiments can specifically point to IME as the cause of expression enhancement - one of the most common is to move the intron upstream of the transcription start site, removing it from the transcript. If the intron can no longer enhance expression, then inclusion of the intron in the transcript is important, and the intron probably causes IME.

Not all introns enhance gene expression, but those that do can enhance expression between 2– and >1,000–fold relative to an intronless control. In Arabidopsis and other plant species, the IMEter has been developed to calculate the likelihood that an intron sequence will enhance gene expression. It does this by calculating a score based on the patterns of nucleotide sequences within the target sequence. The position of an intron within the transcript is also important - the closer an intron is to the start (5' end) of a transcript, the greater its enhancement of gene expression.
